= Baselines of the Chinese territorial sea =

Maritime boundary coordinates

China declared its baselines for its maritime territory on 15 May 1996. The baselines were for the mainland China and also for the Paracel (Xisha) Islands.

The baselines for the mainland consist of a series of straight lines linking 49 basepoints situated on the outer edge along and outer islands off the coast of China. For the Paracel Islands, the baselines consist of a series of straight lines linking 28 basepoints located on the outer islands of the group.

== Baselines legislation and principles ==
The 1996 declaration of China's baselines is based on its law on its territorial sea and the contiguous zone which was adopted on 25 February 1992. Dongyin, Dongsha, Wuqiuyu and Dongdingdao etc. are part of the Republic of China's (Taiwan) Lienchiang County and Kinmen County.

== Basepoints ==
=== Mainland ===
Point	Location	Latitude	Longitude	Remarks
1.	Shandonggaojiao (1)	37° 24.0' N	122° 42.3' E	
2.	Shandonggaojiao (2)	37° 23.7' N	122° 42.3' E	
3.	Moyedao (1)	36° 57.8' N	122° 34.2' E	
4.	Moyedao (2)	36° 55.1' N	122° 32.7' E	
5.	Moyedao (3)	36° 53.7' N	122° 31.1' E	
6.	Sushandao	36° 44.8' N	122° 15.8' E	
7.	Chaoliandao	35° 53.6' N	120° 53.1' E	
8.	Dashandao	35° 00.2' N	119° 54.2' E	
9.	Macaiheng	33° 21.8' N	121° 20.8' E	
10.	Waikejiao	33° 00.9' N	121° 38.4' E	
11.	Sheshandao	31° 25.3' N	122° 14.6' E	
12.	Haijiao	30° 44.1' N	123° 09.4' E	
13.	Dongnanjiao	30° 43.5' N	123° 09.7' E	
14.	Liangxiongdiyu	30° 10.1' N	122° 56.7' E	
15.	Yushanliedao	28° 53.3' N	122° 16.5' E	
16.	Taizhouliedao (1)	28° 23.9' N	121° 55.0' E	
17.	Taizhouliedao (2)	28° 23.5' N	121° 54.7' E	
18.	Daotiaoshan	27° 27.9' N	121° 07.8' E	
19.	Dongyindao	26° 22.6' N	120° 30.4' E	(part of Dongyin Township, Lienchiang County (the Matsu Islands), ROC (Taiwan))
20.	Dongshadao	26° 09.4' N	120° 24.3' E	(part of Dongyin Township, Lienchiang County (the Matsu Islands), ROC (Taiwan))
21.	Niushandao	25° 25.8' N	119° 56.3' E	
22.	Wuqiuyu	24° 58.6' N	119° 28.7' E	(part of Wuqiu Township, Kinmen County (Quemoy), ROC (Taiwan))
23.	Dongdingdao	24° 09.7' N	118° 14.2' E	(part of Jinhu Township, Kinmen County (Quemoy), ROC (Taiwan))
24.	Daganshan	23° 31.9' N	117° 41.3' E	
25.	Nanpengliedao (1)	23° 12.9' N	117° 14.9' E	
26.	Nanpengliedao (2)	23° 12.3' N	117° 13.9' E	
27.	Shibeishanjiao	22° 56.1' N	116° 29.7' E	
28.	Zhentouyan	22° 18.9' N	115° 07.5' E	
29.	Jiapengliedao	21° 48.5' N	113° 58.0' E	
30.	Weijiadao	21° 34.1' N	112° 47.9' E	
31.	Dafanshi	21° 27.7' N	112° 21.5' E	
32.	Qizhouliedao	19° 58.5' N	111° 16.4' E	
33.	Shuangfan	19° 53.0' N	111° 12.8' E	
34.	Dazhoudao (1)	18° 39.7' N	110° 29.6' E	
35.	Dazhoudao (2)	18° 39.4' N	110° 29.1' E	
36.	Shuangfanshi	18° 26.1' N	110° 08.4' E	
37.	Lingshuijiao	18° 23.0' N	110° 03.0' E	
38.	Dongzhou (1)	18° 11.0' N	109° 42.1' E	
39.	Dongzhou (2)	18° 11.0' N	109° 41.8' E	
40.	Jinmujiao	18° 09.5' N	109° 34.4' E	
41.	Shenshijiao	18° 14.6' N	109° 07.6' E	
42.	Xigudao	18° 19.3' N	108° 57.1' E	
43.	Yinggezui (1)	18° 30.2' N	108° 41.3' E	
44.	Yinggezui (2)	18° 30.4' N	108° 41.1' E	
45.	Yinggezui (3)	18° 31.0' N	108° 40.6' E	
46.	Yinggezui (4)	18° 31.1' N	108° 40.5' E	
47.	Gan'enjiao	18° 50.5' N	108° 37.3' E	
48.	Sigengshajiao	19° 11.6' N	108° 36.0' E	
49.	Junbijiao	19° 21.1' N	108° 38.6' E	

=== Paracel Islands ===
Point	Location	Latitude	Longitude	Remarks
1.	Dongdao (1)	16° 40.5' N	112° 44.2' E	
2.	Dongdao (2)	16° 40.1' N	112° 44.5' E	
3.	Dongdao (3)	16° 39.8' N	112° 44.7' E	
4.	Langhuajiao (1)	16° 04.4' N	112° 35.8' E	
5.	Langhuajiao (2)	16° 01.9' N	112° 32.7' E	
6.	Langhuajiao (3)	16° 01.5' N	112° 31.8' E	
7.	Langhuajiao (4)	16° 01.0' N	112° 29.8' E	
8.	Zhongjiandao (1)	15° 46.5' N	111° 12.6' E	
9.	Zhongjiandao (2)	15° 46.4' N	111° 12.1' E	
10.	Zhongjiandao (3)	15° 46.4' N	111° 11.8' E	
11.	Zhongjiandao (4)	15° 46.5' N	111° 11.6' E	
12.	Zhongjiandao (5)	15° 46.7' N	111° 11.4' E	
13.	Zhongjiandao (6)	15° 46.9' N	111° 11.3' E	
14.	Zhongjiandao (7)	15° 47.2' N	111° 11.4' E	
15.	Beijiao (1)	17° 04.9' N	111° 26.9' E	
16.	Beijiao (2)	17° 05.4' N	111° 26.9' E	
17.	Beijiao (3)	17° 05.7' N	111° 27.2' E	
18.	Beijiao (4)	17° 06.0' N	111° 27.8' E	
19.	Beijiao (5)	17° 06.5' N	111° 29.2' E	
20.	Beijiao (6)	17° 07.0' N	111° 31.0' E	
21.	Beijiao (7)	17° 07.1' N	111° 31.6' E	
22.	Beijiao (8)	17° 06.9' N	111° 32.0' E	
23.	Zhaoshudao (1)	16° 59.9' N	112° 14.7' E	
24.	Zhaoshudao (2)	16° 59.7' N	112° 15.6' E	
25.	Zhaoshudao (3)	16° 59.4' N	112° 16.6' E	
26.	Beidao	16° 58.4' N	112° 18.3' E	
27.	Zhongdao	16° 57.6' N	112° 19.6' E	
28.	Nandao	16° 56.9' N	112° 20.5' E	

== See also ==
- Nine-dash line
