= Zhongcheng Gate =

Gate in Dongyin, Lienchiang, Taiwan

- 忠誠門
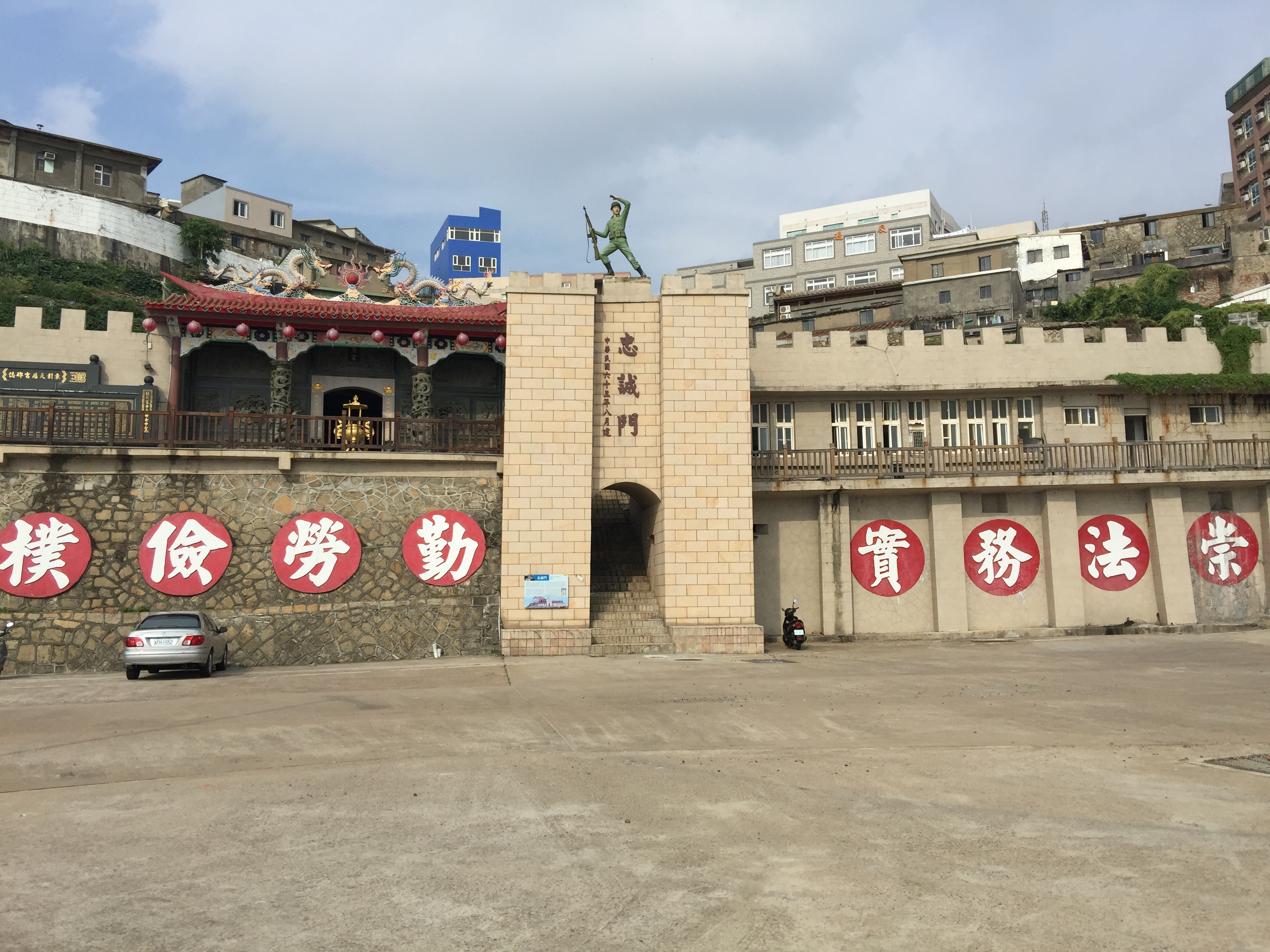
- Interactive map of the Zhongcheng Gate area

General information
- Type: gate
- Location: Dongyin, Lienchiang, Taiwan
- Coordinates: 26°22′01.1″N 120°29′12.2″E

The Zhongcheng Gate (traditional Chinese: 忠誠門; simplified Chinese: 忠诚门; pinyin: Zhōngchéng Mén) is a gate in Dongyin Township, Lienchiang County, Taiwan.

== History ==
The gate was originally built as the port for the Republic of China Armed Forces to enter and exit the island. The function of the port was later on replaced by Zhongzhu Harbor. During the Mainland China military exercises around Matsu Islands in August 2022, local people were seen dancing in foam to music in front of the gate.

== Architecture ==
The gate features a soldier statue on top of it.
