= Dashan Island =

Island in the East China Sea

Coordinates: 35°00′02″N 119°54′12″E

- Traditional Chinese: 達山島
- Simplified Chinese: 达山岛
Transcriptions
Standard Mandarin
- Hanyu Pinyin: Dáshāndǎo
- Wade–Giles: Ta-shan Tao

Danianshan Island
- Traditional Chinese: 達念山島
- Simplified Chinese: 达念山岛
Transcriptions
Standard Mandarin
- Hanyu Pinyin: Dániànshān Dǎo
- Wade–Giles: Ta-nian-shan Tao

Taibujiao
- Chinese: 泰簿礁
Transcriptions
Standard Mandarin
- Hanyu Pinyin: Tàibùjiāo
- Wade–Giles: T'ai-pu-chiao

Dashan Island, also known as Danianshan and Taibujiao, is an island in the East China Sea administered as part of Qiansandao, Lianyungang Prefecture, Jiangsu Province, China.

Dashan Island has an area of 0.115 km^{2} (0.044 sq mi). It is part of the Qiansan Islands and is located 28 nmi (52 km) from Lianyungang.

It is one of the baselines of the Chinese territorial sea and the PLA erected territorial sea steles on the island in 2006.

== See also ==
- Suyanjiao (Suyan Rock)
- Macaiheng
- Waikejiao
- Haijiao
- Baselines of the Chinese territorial sea
