= Dongnanjiao =

Dongnanjiao may refer to:

- Dongnanjiao Island, in Zhoushan, Zhejiang Province, China
- Dongnanjiao station, station on Line 2 & Line 4, Tianjin Metro, in Tianjin, China
