= Zhongzhu Levee =

Leeve in Dongyin, Lienchiang, Taiwan

- 中柱堤
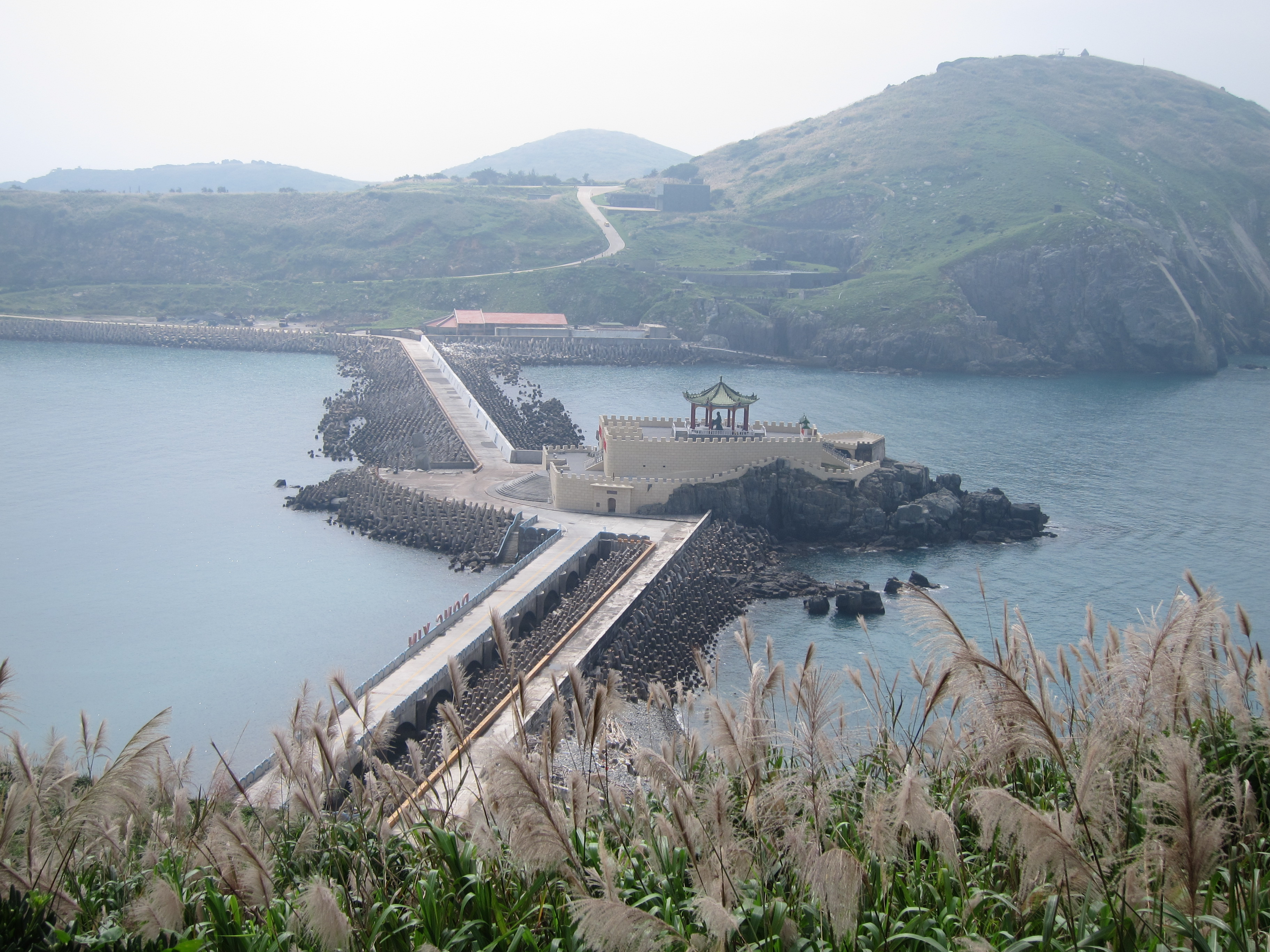
- Interactive map of the Zhongzhu Levee area

General information
- Type: levee
- Location: Dongyin, Lienchiang, Taiwan
- Coordinates: 26°22′13.2″N 120°28′59.1″E
- Completed: 1986

Dimensions
- Other dimensions: 500 meters (length)

The Zhongzhu Levee (Chinese: 中柱堤; pinyin: Zhōngzhù Dī) is a levee in Dongyin Township, Lienchiang County, Taiwan. It connects Xiyin Island and Dongyin Island.

== History ==
The construction of the levee was completed in 1986.

== Architecture ==
The levee spans over a length 500 meters. At the center of the levee, lies the Ganen Pavilion with the statue of former President Chiang Ching-kuo facing south.
