= Dongyin Power Plant =

Power plant in Dongyin, Lienchiang, Taiwan

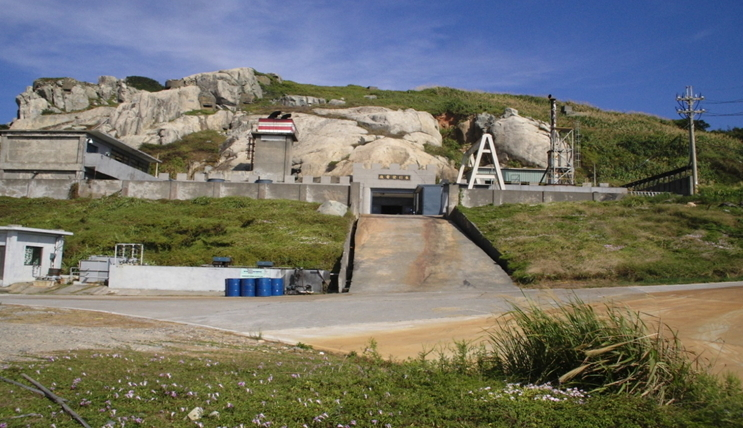
- Official name: 東引發電廠
- Country: Taiwan
- Location: Dongyin, Lienchiang, Taiwan
- Coordinates: 26°22′7.0″N 120°29′50.9″E
- Status: Operational
- Commission date: 31 October 1971
- Owner: Taipower
- Operator: Taipower

Thermal power station
- Primary fuel: Diesel fuel

Power generation
- Nameplate capacity: 6.408 MW

External links
- Commons: Related media on Commons

The Dongyin Power Plant (Chinese: 東引發電廠; pinyin: Dōngyǐn Fādiànchǎng) is a diesel-fuel power plant in Dongyin Township, Lienchiang County, Taiwan.

== History ==
The power plant was commissioned on 31 October 1971.

== See also ==
- List of power stations in Taiwan
- Electricity sector in Taiwan
