= Zhongliu Tianhou Temple =

Temple in Dongyin Township, Lienchiang, Taiwan

Tianhou Temple
- 中柳天后宮
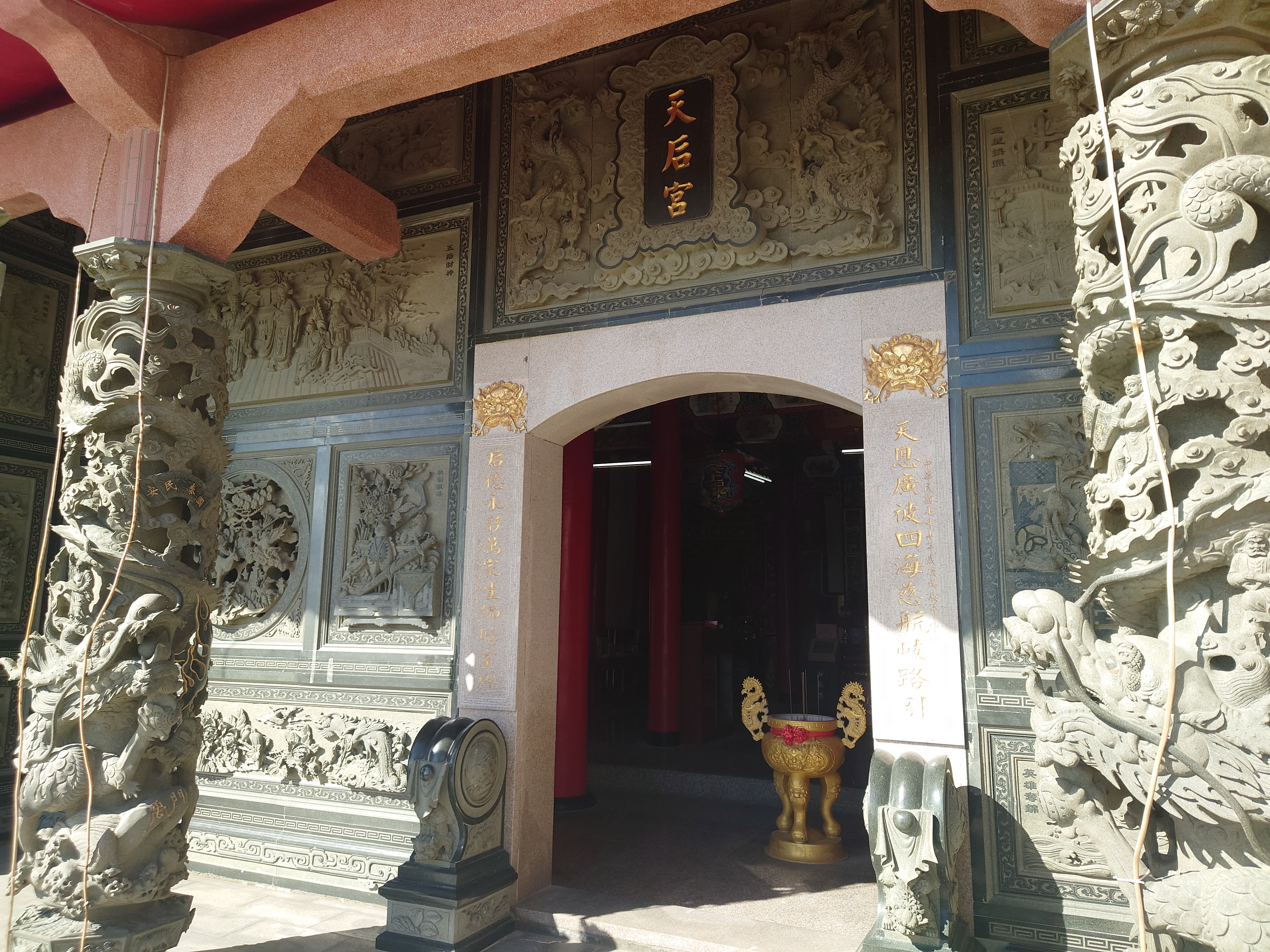

Religion
- Affiliation: Taoism
- Deity: Mazu

Location
- Location: Dongyin, Lienchiang County
- Country: Taiwan
- Interactive map of Tianhou Temple
- Coordinates: 26.3671°N 120.4865°E

Architecture
- Direction of façade: Southwest

Dongyin Zhongliu Tianhou Temple (Chinese: 東引中柳天后宮; pinyin: Dōngyǐn Zhōngliǔ Tiānhòu Gōng) is a Mazu temple located in Zhongliu Village, Dongyin, Lienchiang County, Taiwan. The temple is allegedly founded by Cai Qian, an infamous pirate in the Qing Dynasty.

== History and legend ==
Early records of the temple has been lost, but the temple is believed to have been founded during the reign of Jiaqing Emperor by Cai Qian.

According to tradition, when Cai was harbored in Dongyin, he saw a farmer and his cow cutting down a wheat field on a hill even though it was too early for harvest. Since food was scarce, Cai climbed the hill to investigate, but the farmer, cow, and field had all disappeared. However, from the vantage point, Cai then saw several Qing ships sailing towards Dongyin, so he hastily ordered his men to leave the island. Cai believed that his vision was a spirit protecting him, so he returned to the island to build a Mazu temple, where he also placed statue named Limai Dawang (犁麥大王, lit. "king of cutting wheat") for the temple to worship.
