= Andong Tunnel =

Tunnel in Dongyin, Lienchiang, Taiwan

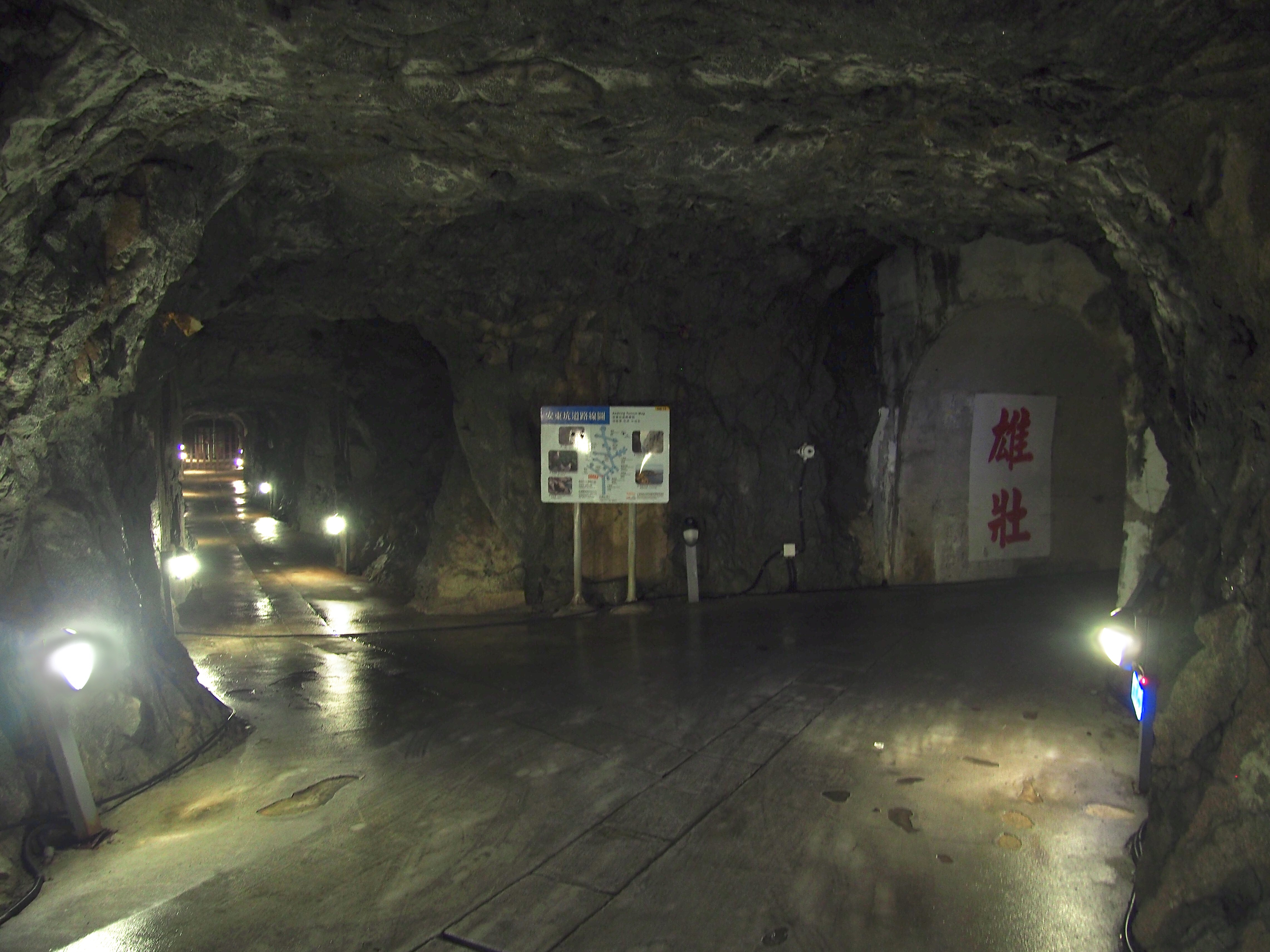
- Interactive map of Andong Tunnel

Overview
- Official name: 安東坑道
- Location: Dongyin, Lienchiang, Taiwan
- Coordinates: 26°21′54.1″N 120°29′46.7″E
- Status: Heritage
- Crosses: Mount Erchong

Operation
- Opened: 1970s
- Reopened: 2004
- Owner: Matsu National Scenic Area Administration

Technical
- Length: 900 m (3,000 ft)

The Andong Tunnel (Chinese: 安東坑道; pinyin: Āndōng Kēngdào) is a tunnel in Dongyin Township, Lienchiang County, Taiwan.

== History ==
The tunnel was constructed in the 1970s by the Republic of China Armed Forces during the cold war with People's Liberation Army. In 2002, the tunnel was transferred to Matsu National Scenic Area Administration and subsequently renovated. It was finally opened to the public in 2004.

== Architecture ==
The tunnel path was constructed with 30 degrees angle downwards with 464 steps at a length of 260 meters. The tunnel itself is 640 meters long. It features military utilities, such as dormitories, ammunition depots, viewing platform etc.

== Geology ==
The tunnel was constructed through Mount Erchong.

== See also ==
- List of tourist attractions in Taiwan
