= Dongyong Lighthouse =

Lighthouse in Dongyin, Lienchiang, Taiwan

Dongyong Lighthouse Tungyung Tao
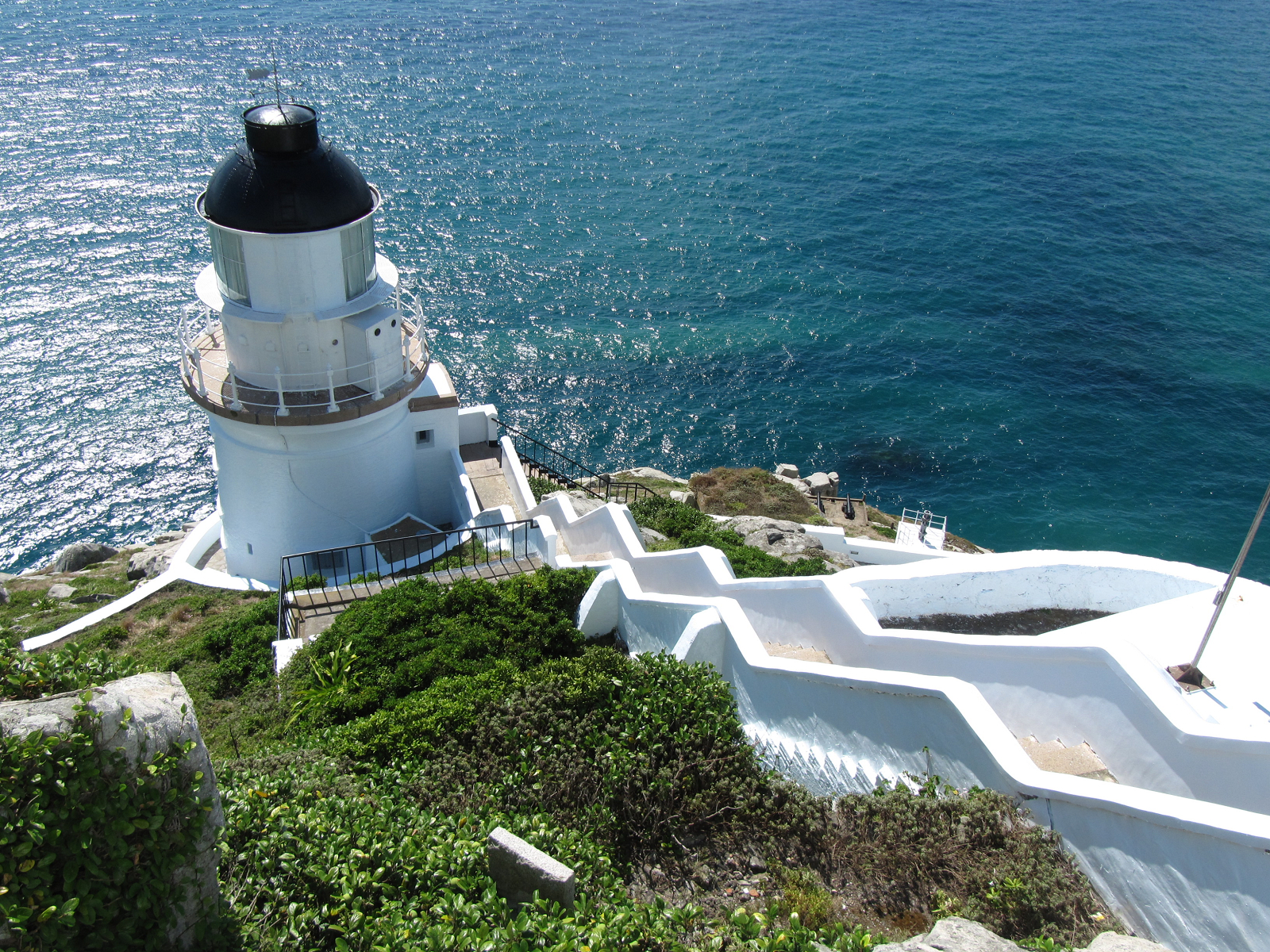
- Location: Dongyin, Lienchiang County (Matsu Islands), Taiwan
- Coordinates: 26.365485°N 120.510512°E

Tower
- Constructed: 1902
- Construction: masonry tower
- Height: 14.2 m (47 ft)
- Shape: cylindrical tower with balcony and lantern
- Markings: white tower, black lantern dome
- Power source: mains electricity
- Operator: Maritime and Port Bureau

Light
- Deactivated: 1958-1989
- Focal height: 978 m (3,209 ft)
- Characteristic: Fl (3) W 15s.

The Dongyong Lighthouse (traditional Chinese: 東湧燈塔; simplified Chinese: 东涌灯塔; pinyin: Dōngyǒng Dēngtǎ) or Tungyung Lighthouse is a lighthouse on the eastern side of Dongyin Island (Tungyung, Dongyong) in Dongyin Township, Lienchiang County, Fujian Province, Taiwan.

== History ==
In the late 19th century, Qing Dynasty opened a port in the area, thus the Dongyong Lighthouse was built by British engineers to guide ships. The construction was completed in 1904. It was designated as third grade national historic site in 1988. That status was later revoked, then restored in 2016.

== Geography ==
The lighthouse faces the Taiwan Strait at the northeast of Dongyin Island.

== Architecture ==
The lighthouse is made of bricks and painted white on the outer walls. The height is 14.3 meters (47 ft) and it flashes light three times every 20 seconds. The building consists of the main body, the lamp and the roof. On the cliff below the lighthouse are two fog water cannons.

== Transportation ==
The lighthouse is accessible by taxi from Dongyin Island harbor.

== See also ==
- List of lighthouses in Taiwan
- List of tourist attractions in Taiwan
