= Haijiao =

Island in Zhejiang, China

Haijiao (海礁), also known as Tong Island (童岛), Taibujiao (泰簿礁) or Taijiao (泰礁), is located at 30°44′6″N 123°9′24″E in the northeast corner of the Zhoushan Islands and belongs to Shengsi County of Zhoushan city. The name Haijiao literally means 'the ocean reef', and its generally accepted cartographic name of Taijiao literally means 'the extreme reef', a reference to its isolated position on the edge of China's maritime territory. It is a baseline point of China's territorial seas.

== See also ==
- Zhoushanqundao (Zhoushan Islands)(舟山群岛)
- Suyanjiao (Suyan Rock) (苏岩礁)
- Dongnanjiao (东南礁)
- Sheshandao (Sheshan Island) (佘山岛)
