= Macaiheng =

Island in Jiangsu, China

Coordinates: 33°21′48″N 121°20′48″E

- Chinese: 麻菜珩
Transcriptions
Standard Mandarin
- Hanyu Pinyin: Mácàihéng
- Wade–Giles: Ma-tsai-heng

Macaiheng is a small sand island in the East China Sea east of Dongtai administered as part of Jiangsu Province, China. Waikejiao is close by.

Macaiheng is one of the baseline point of the Chinese territorial sea.

== See also ==
- Dashandao
- Waikejiao
