= Liangxiongdiyu =

Island in Zhejiang, China

Coordinates: 30°10.1′N 122°56.7′E

Liangxiongdiyu Island ("两兄弟屿") is located 67 km northeast of Shenjiamen. It belongs to the Dongji Town of Zhoushan city. Liangxiongdiyu is the baseline point of the Chinese territorial sea. 2006, The stele of "Chinese territorial sea baseline point" erected.

== See also ==
- Zhoushanqundao (Zhoushan Islands) (舟山群岛)
- Suyanjiao (Suyan Rock) (苏岩礁)
- Sheshandao (Sheshan Island) (佘山岛)
- Yushanliedao (Yushan Islands) (渔山列岛)
- Taizhouliedao (Taizhou Islands) (台州列岛)
