= Dongyin =

Coordinates: 26°21′57″N 120°29′31″E

Dongyin Township 東引鄉 (Chinese) Tungyin, Tung-yin
- Rural township
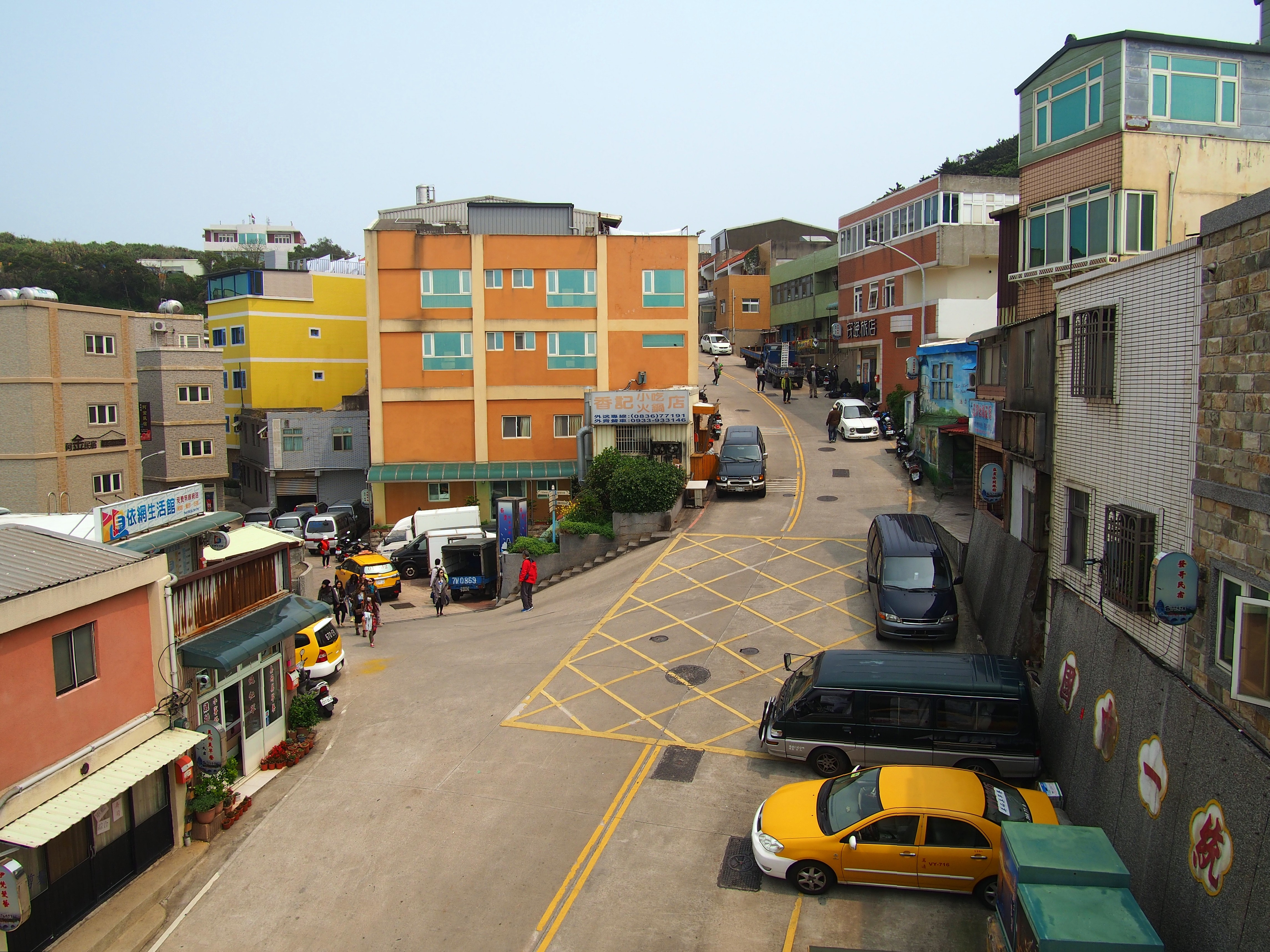

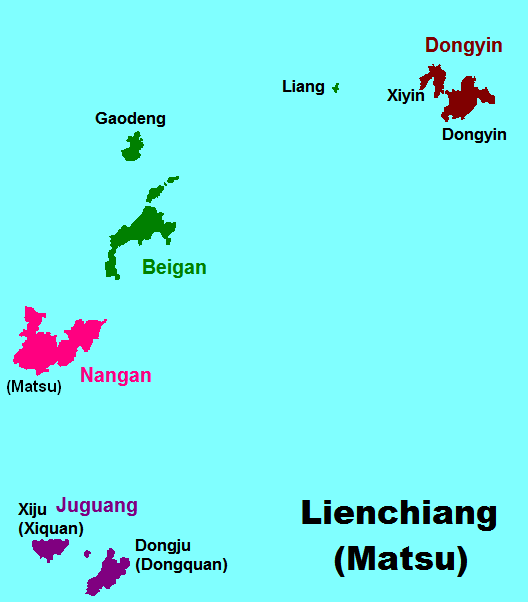
- Dongyin Township in Lienchiang County
- Country: Republic of China (Taiwan)
- Province: Fujian (streamlined)
- County: (Lienchiang County) Lienchiang
- Rural villages: 2

Government
  - Mayor (鄉長): Lin Te-Chien (林德建) (KMT)

Area
  - Total: 4.4 km^{2} (1.7 sq mi)

Population (March 2023)
  - Total: 1,550
  - Density: 350/km^{2} (910/sq mi)
- Time zone: UTC+8 (National Standard Time)
- Postal code: 212
- Website: www.dongyin.gov.tw/en/view.html (in English), www.dongyin.gov.tw (in Chinese)

Location of Dongyin, Lienchiang

Dongyin Township (Tungyin) (Chinese: 東引鄉; pinyin: Dōngyǐn Xiāng; Wade–Giles: Tung¹-yin³ Hsiang¹; Foochow Romanized: Dĕ̤ng-īng-hiŏng) is an insular rural township which is part of Lienchiang County (the Matsu Islands), Fujian Province, Republic of China (Taiwan). The islands are in the East China Sea off the coast of Fujian Province, China near the cities of Fuzhou (Foochow) and Ningde. The township is known for its natural environment and Eastern Min culture, for the historical Dongyong Lighthouse and for its military importance and history as the northernmost territory of Taiwan.

== Name ==
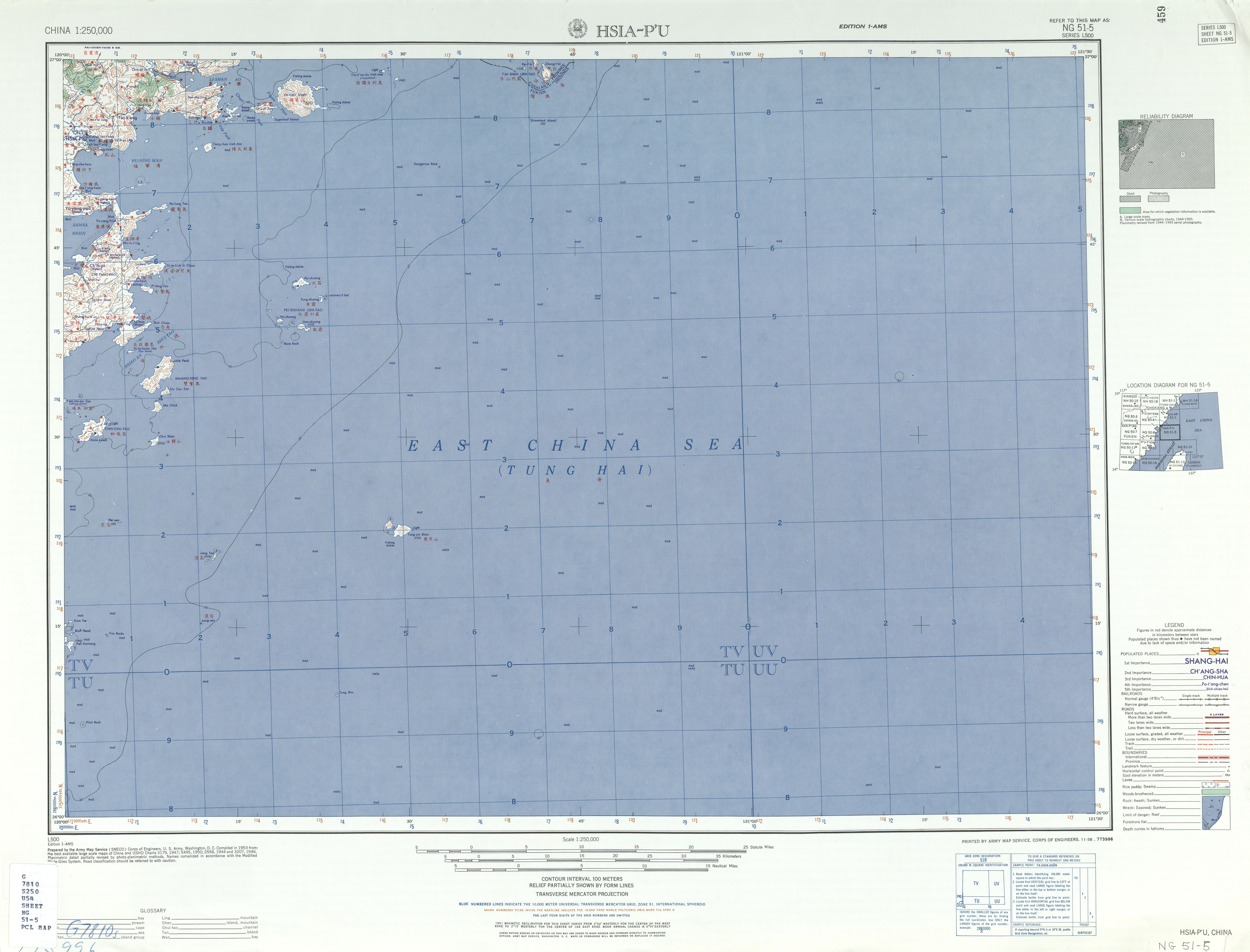
Map including Dongyin (labelled as Tung-yin Shan 東引山) and Dongsha/Tung Sha (AMS, 1953)

Dongyin Township is named after Dongyin Island (Tungyin Island), the main island of the township. The Wade-Giles derived English language names for Dongyin derived from the name '東引' are Tungyin and Tung-yin.

Dongyin Island (Tungyin Island) (Chinese: 東引島; Hanyu Pinyin: Dōngyǐn Dǎo; Tongyong Pinyin: Dongyǐn Dǎo; Wade–Giles: Tung¹-yin³ Tao³; Foochow Romanized: Dĕ̤ng-īng-dō̤) was originally called Tungyung Island / Tung Yung / Tung-yung (Dongyong) (Chinese: 東湧; pinyin: Dōngyǒng; Wade–Giles: Tung¹-yung³).

The second largest island is Xiyin (Siyin Island, Hsiyin) (Chinese: 西引島; Hanyu Pinyin: Xīyǐn Dǎo; Tongyong Pinyin: Siyǐn Dǎo; Wade–Giles: Hsi¹-yin³ Tao³).

In between the two main islands is the small Zhongzhu Island (Chinese: 中柱島; pinyin: Zhōngzhù Dǎo). The three islands have been linked by a causeway since 1986. Beigu Reef is north of Xiyin Island and Shuangzijiao is south of Dongyin Island. Dongsha Dao (Tung Sha, Tung-sha Tao, Alligator Island; Chinese: 東沙島; pinyin: Dōngshā Dǎo; Wade–Giles: Tung¹-sha¹ Tao³), considered a basepoint of the Chinese territorial sea by the PRC, is located approximately 25 kilometres (13 nmi) southwest of Dongyin Island. A larger island (Pratas Island) in the South China Sea with the same Chinese character name is administered by Cijin District, Kaohsiung, Taiwan.

== History ==
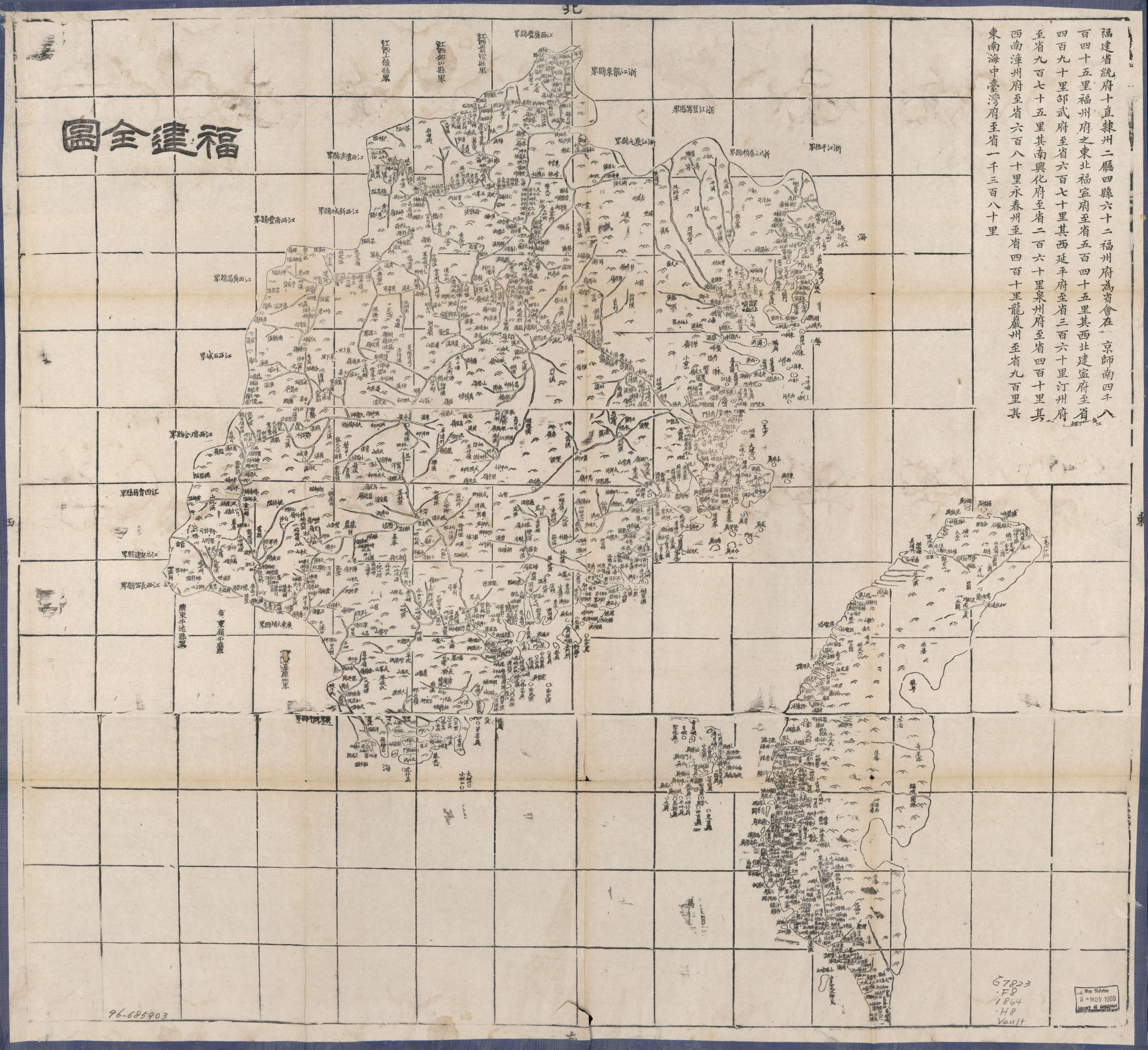
Dongyin Island (labelled 東引山)

In 1579–80, wokou pirates attacked Dongyin (Tung-yung).

=== Qing Dynasty ===
In 1843, there was a large village and fishing establishment on the western side of Dongyin (Tung Yung).

On the morning of April 24, 1901, the Peninsular and Oriental Line steamship SS Sobraon (蘇布倫號) ran ashore in heavy fog and was stranded at Dongyin Island (Tungyung Island). The ship was later abandoned and sunk.

In 1902, it was decided to build a lighthouse on Dongyin Island (Tungyung Island), financed by the British government.

The Dongyong Lighthouse was built in 1904. The lighthouse began operating on May 18, 1904.

=== Republic of China ===
The lighthouse was repaired in 1913.

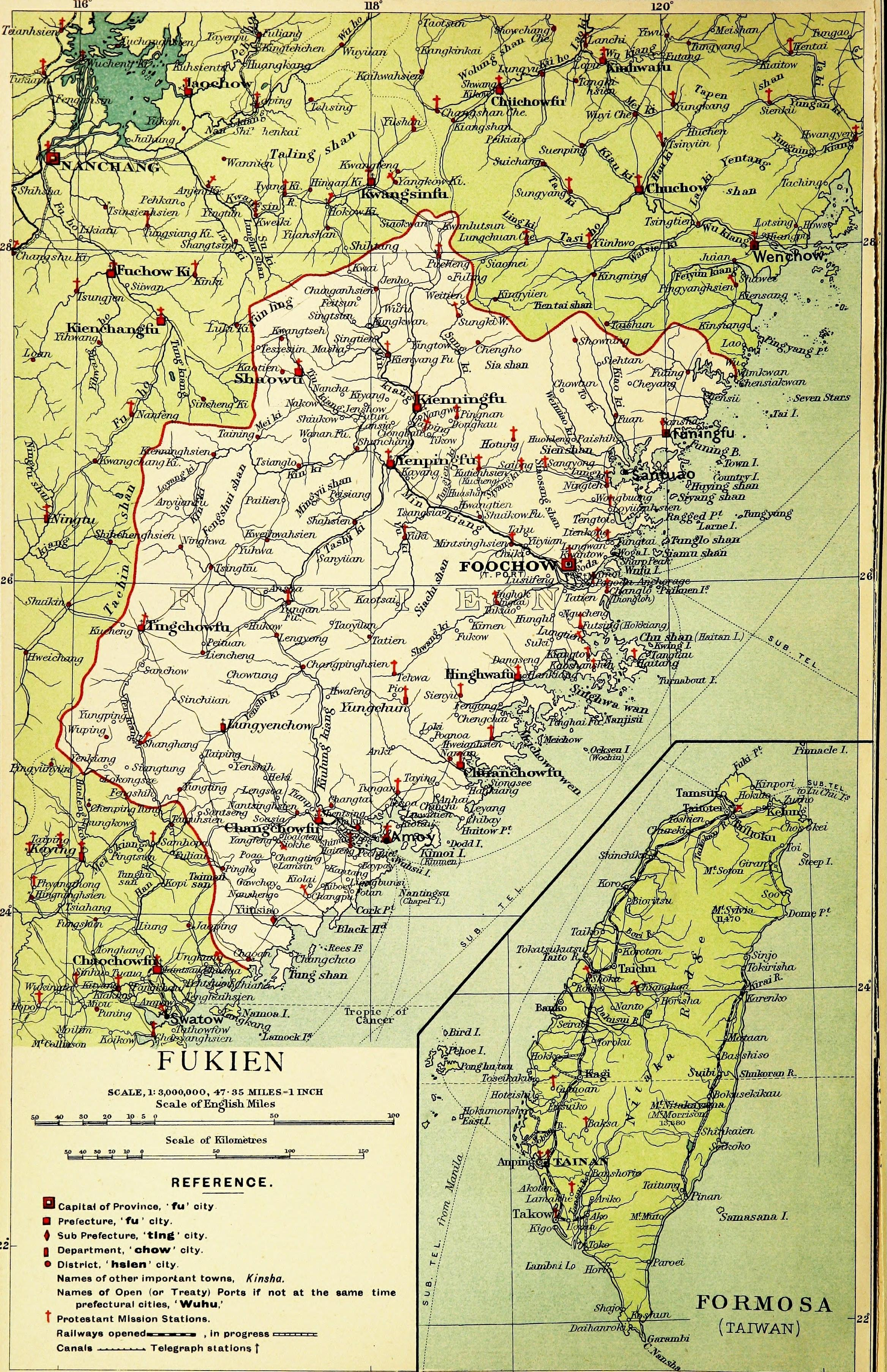
Dongyin (labelled Tungyung)

In 1916, due to sudden shifts in wind, two hundred fishing ships were damaged. A few people were killed and injured.

In 1931, the roofs of all the buildings were blown off in extreme winds.

On the night of November 11, 1931, HMS Petersfield ran ashore on the northern side of Dongyin (Tungyung) with Admiral Howard Kelly, Commander-in-Chief, China aboard.

From 1939 to 1950, opium poppy planting and the manufacture and sale of opium was an economic mainstay for the islanders.

In the wake of the surrender of Japan in Autumn 1945, representatives of Siapu County, Changlo County and Lienchiang County visited Dongyin (Tungyung) and contested control of the islands between their counties. The provincial government determined that Dongyin (Tungyung) was part of Lienchiang County.

On February 19, 1955, Nationalist planes mistakenly bombed the island, causing the death of an elderly woman and some property damage.

On July 16, 1956, the township was assigned to Lienchiang County.

In 1958, the lighthouse temporarily stopped operation due to military concerns.

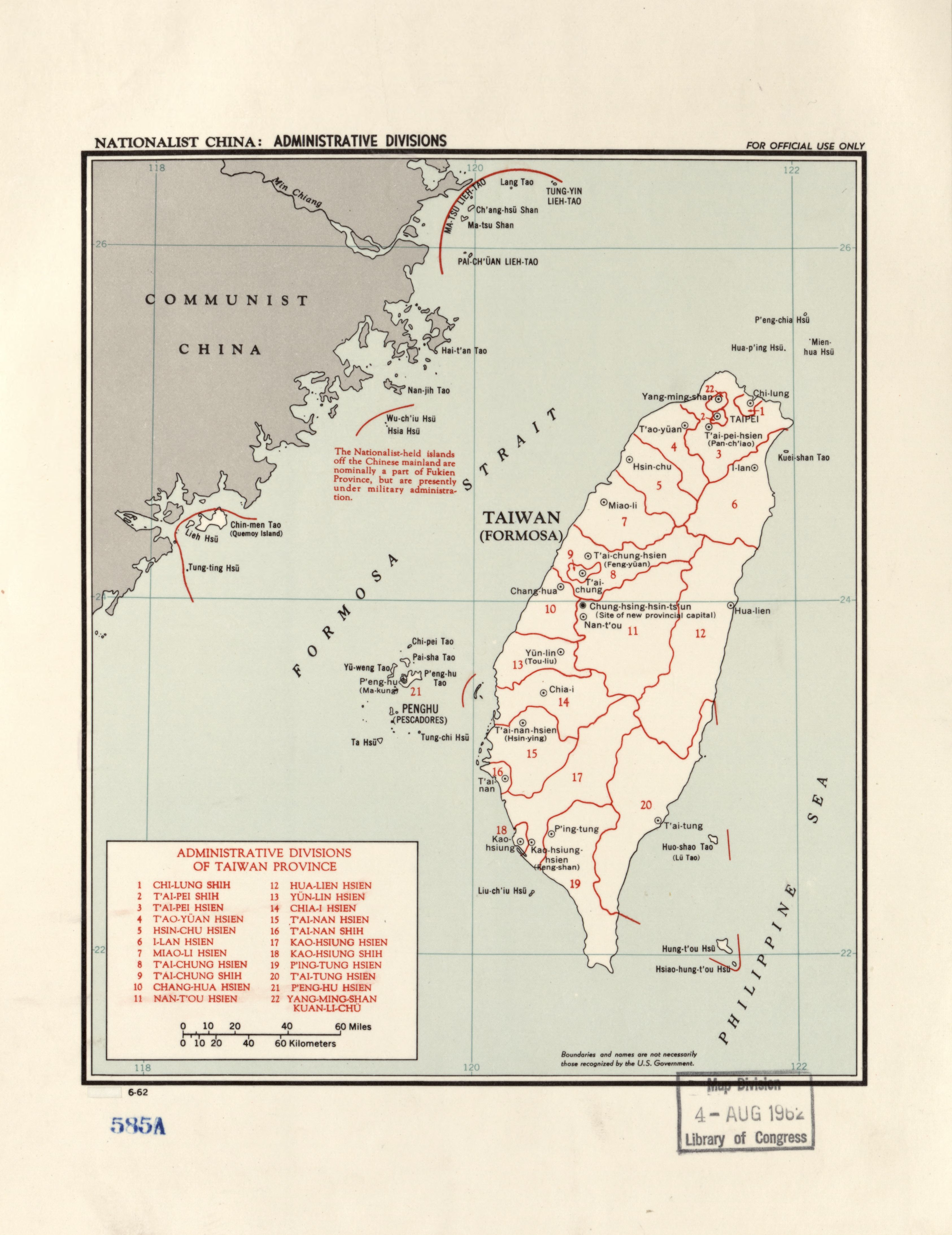
Dongyin (labelled TUNG-YIN LIEH-TAO) "The Nationalist-held islands off the Chinese mainland are nominally a part of Fukien Province, but are presently under military administration." (1962)

On May 7, 1963, President Chiang Kai-shek visited the township.

On the morning of May 1, 1965, the Battle of Dong-Yin occurred in the waters north of the township.

On April 13 and August 22, 1979, and May 2, July 18, and September 29, 1980, President Chiang Ching-kuo visited the township.

Construction of the Dongyong Reservoir (東湧水庫) began in 1982 and was completed in 1985.

On May 21, 1985, an attempt by Chinese Communist forces to collect information about Dongyin (Tungyin) by using the hijacked Taiwanese boat Hungchi No 1 (宏志一號) was stopped.

On September 19, 1988, and August 10, 1990, President Lee Teng-hui visited the township.

In 1989, the lighthouse resumed operation.

On August 9, 2005, and February 5, 2008, President Chen Shui-bian visited the township.

On June 19, 2010, President Ma Ying-jeou visited the township.

On June 24, 2014, the wreckage of the SS Sobraon was found.

In late April 2019, representatives from the Dongyin Township government visited nearby Haidao Township (PRC).

On December 9, 2020, a ceremony was held marking the beginning of the rebuilding of the township government office and parking area.

On February 16, 2023 at about 11 a.m., a suspected weather balloon believed to have originated in China was discovered at a shooting range on Dongyin.

== Geography ==
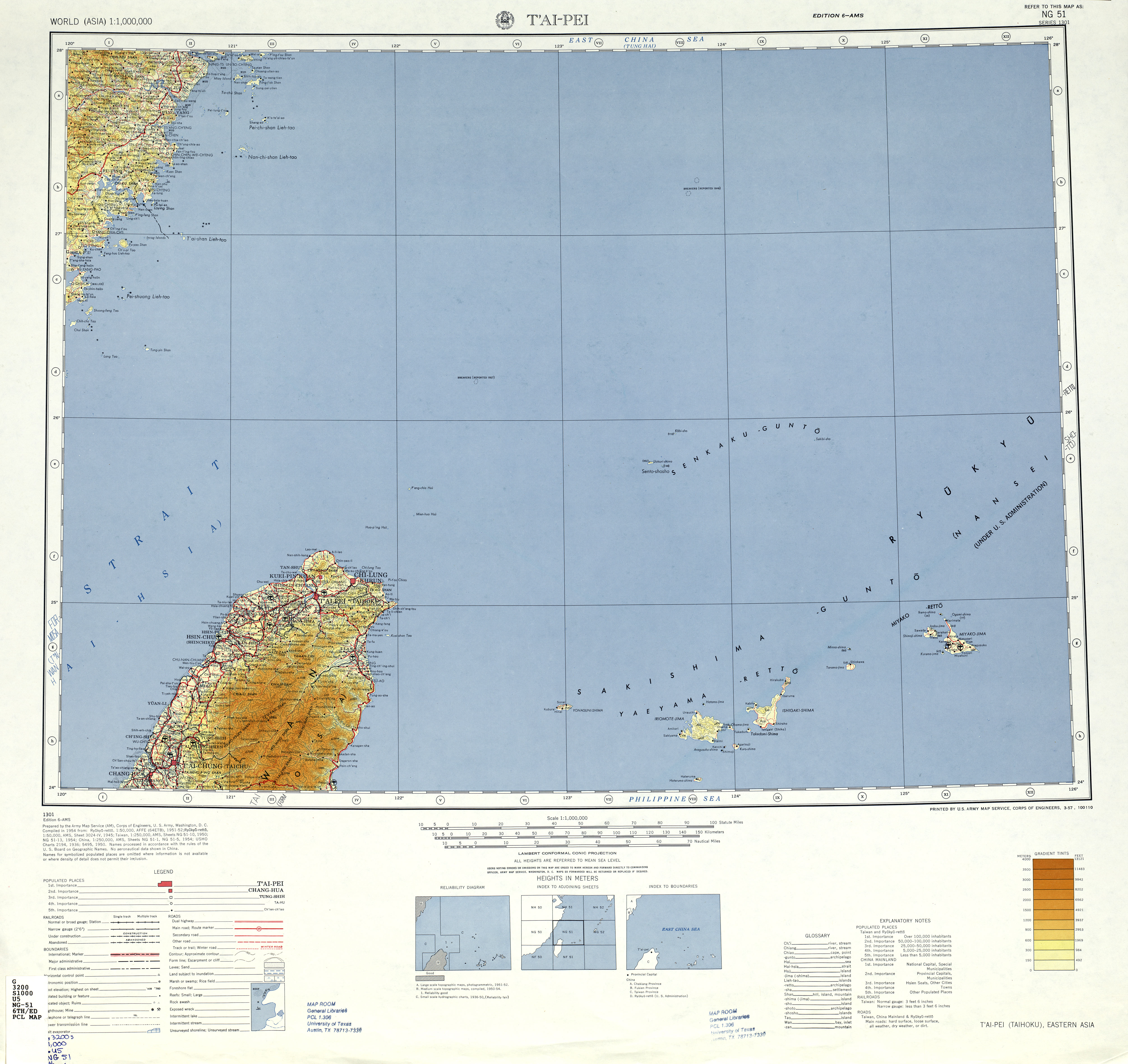
Map including Dongyin (labeled as Tung-yin Shan) (AMS, 1954)

Dongyin Township is an archipelago in the East China Sea off the PRC-administered Loyuan Bay (羅源灣; Lò̤-nguòng-uăng) and is approximately 100.0 nautical miles (185.2 km) from Keelung on Taiwan, with a total area of 4.4 km^{2}. The east coast of Shi Wei Mountain (世尾山) on Dongyin is the easternmost of the Matsu Islands (26。 23' 08N, 120。 30' 08 E), while the north coast of Beigu Reef (北固礁) on Xiyin (Siyin) is the northernmost of the Matsu Islands. Dongyin itself is the northernmost point of the territory of the Republic of China (Taiwan). The islands are the key transportation hub between Mawei and Shanghai, and are of strategic importance in the Taiwan Strait area.

The Sishuang islands (四礵) in Haidao Township, Xiapu County, Ningde, Fujian, China (PRC) are north-northwest of the township.

The deepest point in the waters around the Matsu Islands is off the coast of Dongyin. After passing Liang Island (also referred as Wave Islet), ships riding from Nangan encounter stronger waves, which explains why Dongyin was originally called Tungyung (Dongyong). The waters around Dongyin host large schools of fish, and coral reefs, which makes Dongyin one of the best domestic fishing spots and the most densely populated conservation area for Larus crassirostris (黑尾鷗).

The township was originally part of the Loyüan County before the ROC government evacuated to Taiwan in 1949 following the Chinese civil war. It is claimed by the People's Republic of China government as part of the Luoyuan County of its Fuzhou prefecture.

The geological formation of Dongyin is closely related to Mainland China, where the granite bedrock was formed by Yanshan Movement (燕山運動) dated to 100 – 200 million years ago. Thanks to its resistance to weathering, granite bedrock is seen above ground widespread in Dongyin. Although massive granite is tough, lacking internal structures, granite of poor primary permeability is easily eroded by sea water, rain, and gales, resulting in various coastal sights.

The coastal line of Dongyin is maternally related to that in Fujian, drowned valleys (谷灣式海岸) of Submergent Coastlines (沈水海岸). Caps and embayments, typical coastline traits, are prevalent. Caps feature cliff erosion, including sea caves, marine arches, sea stacks, sea trenches, and abrasion platforms, while sea caves are dominant. The less prevailing sedimentary landforms are mainly seen in the inlets and are characteristic of pebble beaches.

=== Distinctive geological features ===
On account of the geological distinctiveness of Dongyin, in "Natural Landscapes and Resources Survey in the Matsu Islands" (馬祖地區地景資源調查), conducted in 2000 by National Taiwan University Professor Ging-Chan Lin, twelve out of eighteen sights on the island were rated A. Among the 5 evaluation criteria, vividness, diversity, and scarcity best manifest the peculiarity of the island.

Seeing as its various and geological formations, six features of Dongyin are introduced as below.

=== Rocky coastlines ===
The bedrock of Dongyin comprises mainly gray granite, characteristic of primitiveness and assorted texture. As a consequence, odd and jagged rocks are on display.

Most of the hills on Dongyin are covered with grass, with granite underneath. The surrounding granite cliffs are connected with sea, waves, rocks, soil, grass, and sky, creating a wide range of colors, including navy blue, white, maize, and jade. Along the sea coast of Dongyin, the serial changes of colors can be taken in at a single glance.

=== Suicide Cliff ===
This is a towering abrasion cliff, about 100 meters deep. Looking over the cliff, one is easily shocked by the impact of elevation differences. The expanding and steep terrain originated from sea gulfs is the consequence of poor primary permeability of granite and continuous erosion caused by seawater.

It is said that a woman abducted by robbers at the end of Qing Dynasty didn't surrender. She escaped to this spot and jumped off into the sea. This place is subsequently named after her. Nowadays, at Suicide Cliff, bamboo handrails and observatory are set up, followed with revitalization of old walls on which 'Righteous Virtue High up Sky, Patriotism Echo through Eternity' are inscribed to commemorate her deeds.

=== Rat Sands Stone Forest ===
Rat Sands Stone Forest (老鼠沙) is located in the coral reefs in the south of Erchong (二重), named for its resemblance to a rat. Legend has it that the Lins in Ban Ciao became wealthy because of the good Feng Shui of their main living room facing Rat Sands.

The variations of cliff erosions on Dongyin range from natural arches, sea gulfs, sea caves, sea stacks. Among those coastal landforms. Rat Sands Stone Forest stone forest is the most famous. For a good lookout at Rat Sands, Dongyong Lighthouse and Taibai Echo Cliff (太白天聲) are good spots. For excellent camera shots, the east of the top observatory of Yanxiu Tidal Echo (Yansiou Echoing with Tidal Cave) (燕秀潮音) is the best bet.

=== Dragon Sea Cave ===
Dragon Sea Cave (海現龍闕) is situated in the south of Beiao (北澳), and at the east coastline of Wind Tiger Cape (風虎角). A meters-long sea chasm and a sea arch formed on the seafront after years of erosion by strong wind and waves. Retreat of a sea cliff exposes basalt bedrock. When the sea is at peace, divisional planes and grains of basalt rock are observed. With wind and waves picking up, or during the fog season (March - May), the image of the sea arch flickers in the waves and fog, like a dragon playing in the water. Therefore, Dragon Sea Cave is nicknamed "Marine Dragon Play at Sea". The sleek and agile dragon is the long-eroded sea arch.

=== Dongao ===
Due to the scarcity of extensive tidal flats and sandy beaches in Dongyin, the pebble beach in Dongao (東澳) is one of few ports that give access to the sea. The stairs connected to the port used to be very steep, but after renovation, they are now well established with handrails. Tourists can stay under the shade of huge stones away from blistering sun. The pebbles at the port are suitable for resting and dabbling.

Because of the constant erosion by waves, the coastal landforms demonstrate various bizarre stones. All over Dongao are sea arches, sea gulfs, cliffs, and wave-cut platforms, and so on. Over the cliff, right under your nose is the marvelous scenery, with bright blue sea in the backdrop.

=== Luohanping ===
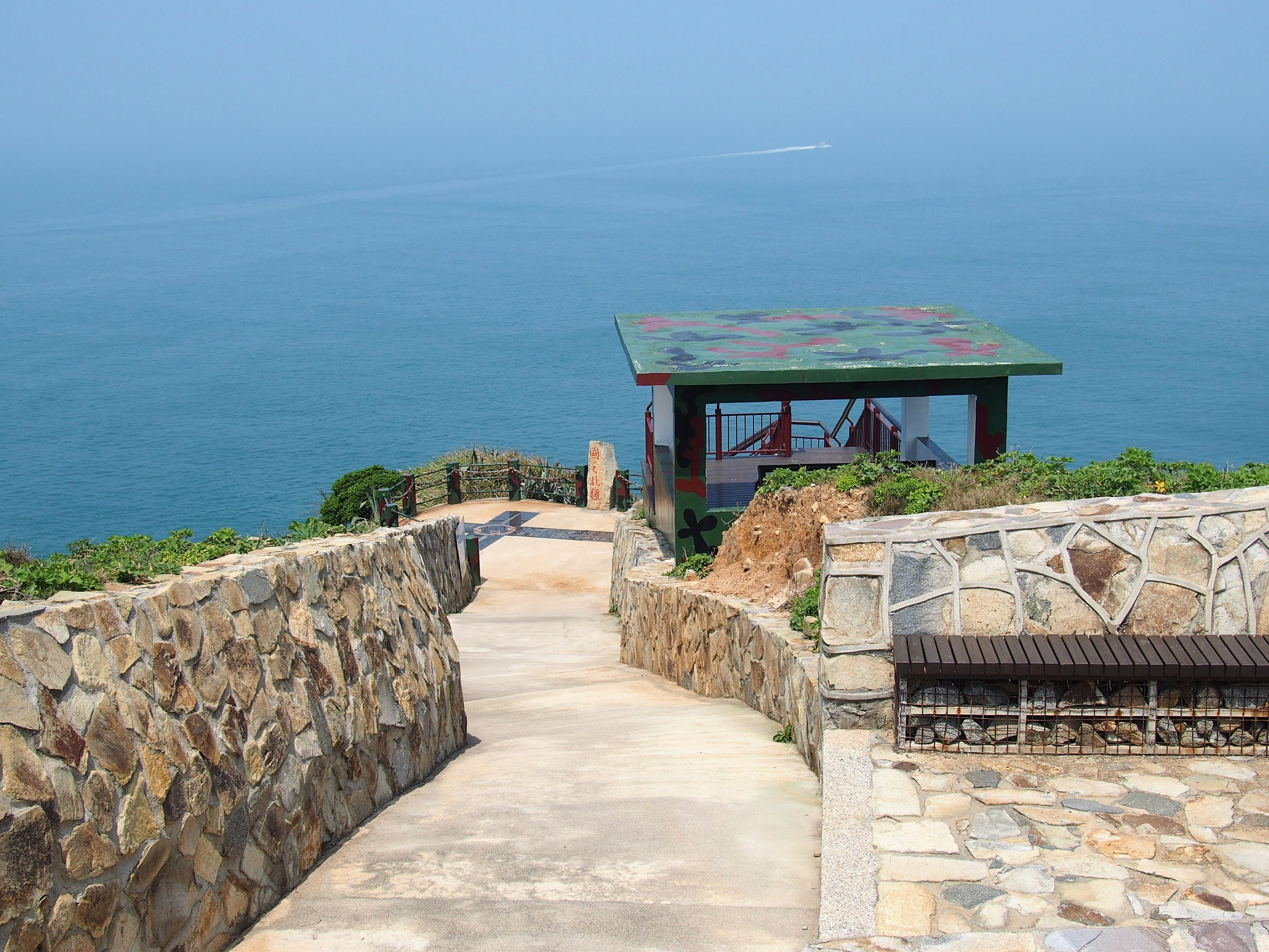
Northernmost Frontier

Luohanping (Lohan Flat) (羅漢坪) is coral reefs located in the northwest of Xiyin (Siyin). 'Lohan Flat Stupid' (羅漢坪笨), as called by the inhabitants, is renamed Lohan Flat after the Army stationed there. 'Ping ban' (坪笨) refers to a flat stone in Fuzhou dialect, characteristic of the wave-cut platforms coexisting with sea gulfs and sea stacks. Viewed from at sea towards the coral reefs, the high sea stacks and stumps are almost lifelike 'eighteen arhats' (十八羅漢) standing in a line, which explains how 'Arhat Stump' (羅漢柱) gets its name.

The location of the northernmost Frontier (國之北疆) is at East Cape (東方岬角) at Lohan Flat. Standing on the observatory, overlooking the west side, you'll be amazed with the grandiose sight of Three-colored Stone (三色石).

== Government and politics ==
=== Administrative divisions ===
Dongyin Township is made up of two rural villages:

- Lehua Village (Chinese: 樂華村; pinyin: Lèhuá Cūn; Foochow Romanized: Ngŏk-huà-chŏng) (name derived from '老鴉角')
- Zhongliu / Jhongliou Village (Chinese: 中柳村; Hanyu Pinyin: Zhōngliǔ Cūn; Tongyong Pinyin: Jhongliǒu Cun) (name derived from '中流角')

=== Mayors ===
- Huang Hsing-Hua (黃星華) (July 16, 1956 – May 1, 1959)
- Yu Te-Chu (尤德渠) (May 1, 1959 – January 1, 1962)
- Chen Shou-Wei (陳壽維) (January 1, 1962-November 1963)
- Wang Chih-Jen (王志任) (November 1963-May 1, 1970)
- Lin Shou-Chi (林守基) (May 1, 1970 – October 8, 1974)
- Chen An-Ko (陳安國) (October 8, 1974 – March 1, 1986)
- Chen Pao-Ming (陳寶銘) (March 1, 1986 – August 31, 1993) (before his term ended, was to serve as secretary to County Magistrate Tsao Chang-Shun (曹常順); for the remaining period of his term Township Secretary Chen Duan-Tsai (陳端才) acted as mayor in his place)
- Lin Jih-Fu (林日福) (March 3, 1994 – June 20, 2001) (died from disease during his term in office; Township Secretary Chen Duan-Tsai (陳端才) acted as mayor in his place)
- Chen Pao-Ming (陳寶銘) (March 1, 2002 – August 13, 2005) (died suddenly from heart disease; Township Secretary Chen Duan-Tsai (陳端才) acted as mayor in his place)
- Feng Yin-lo (馮印樂) (March 1, 2006 – December 24, 2014)
- Yang Yun-Cheng (楊雲成) (December 25, 2014 – December 24, 2019)
- Lin Te-Chien (林德建) (December 25, 2019 – present)

=== Military ===
Due to its military significance, Dongyin has been an active and heavily stationed base. As of early 2001, up to 50 Tien Chi (Sky Spear) missiles were deployed at two sites: Tungyin Island, and an unidentified second location. The Tungyin Island missiles are said to be housed in silos and protected by batteries of Tien Kung-2 SAMs. The number of soldiers, the major consumers, is several times as many as the residents.

== Demographics ==
The inhabitants are genetically related to Changle, Fujian. Till today, Fuzhou accent and Ningde (閩東) customs are still well maintained. Among the last names of the one thousand inhabitants, the majority are Lin, Chen, and Liu.

As of 2018, persons over 65 years of age made up 7.7% of the population of Dongyin Township, which was the lowest proportion of the population of any township in Taiwan (ROC).

== Economy ==
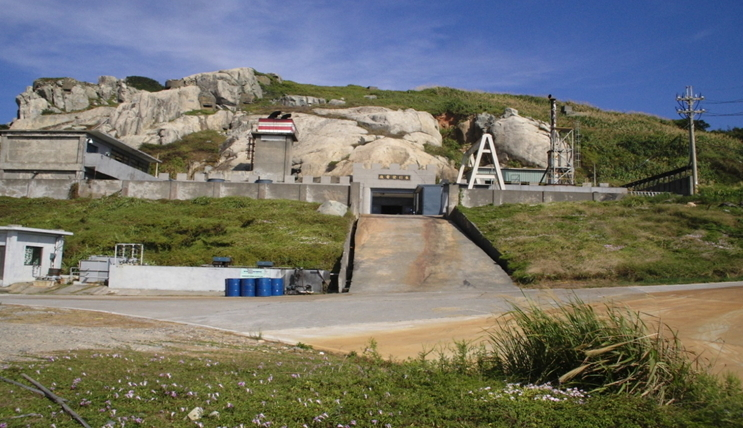
Dongyin Power Plant

After years of dependence on large quantities of fish as food, the fish resources have been depleted. The main source of income is from shop and store businesses. Public service sectors include one Town Hall, one police station, and one health center. In recent years, developing tourism has become a goal for the local administration and inhabitants to achieve.

=== Energy ===
The electricity for the township is supplied by the Dongyin Power Plant.

== Education ==
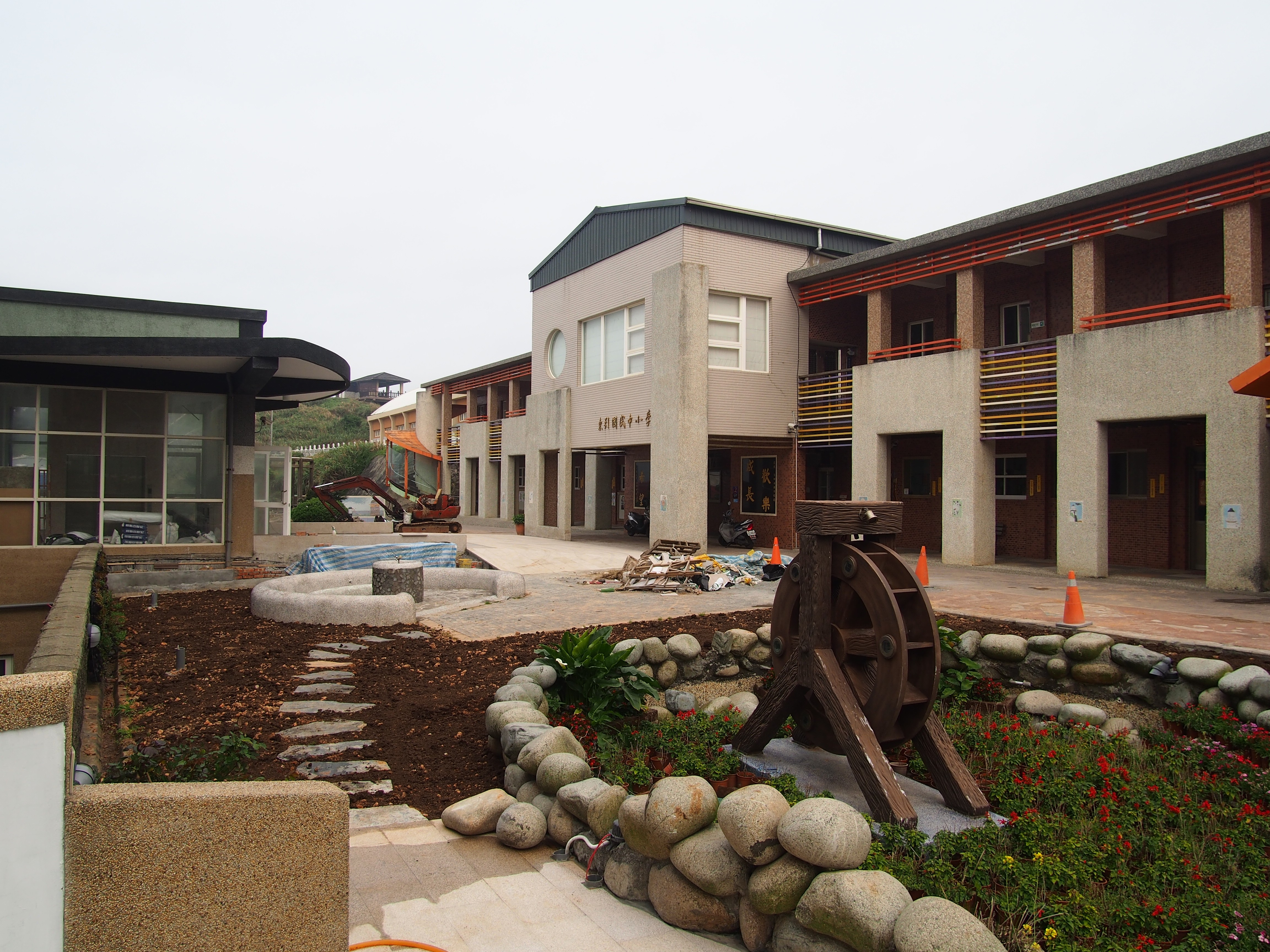
Dongyin Elementary and Junior High School

The township has one school: Lienchiang County Dongyin Elementary and Junior High School (連江縣立東引國民中小學). Therefore, most of the islanders move out from the township to pursue any education at the senior high school level or higher.

National Matsu Senior High School (國立馬祖高級中學), operated by the national government, is located in Nangan.

== Transportation ==
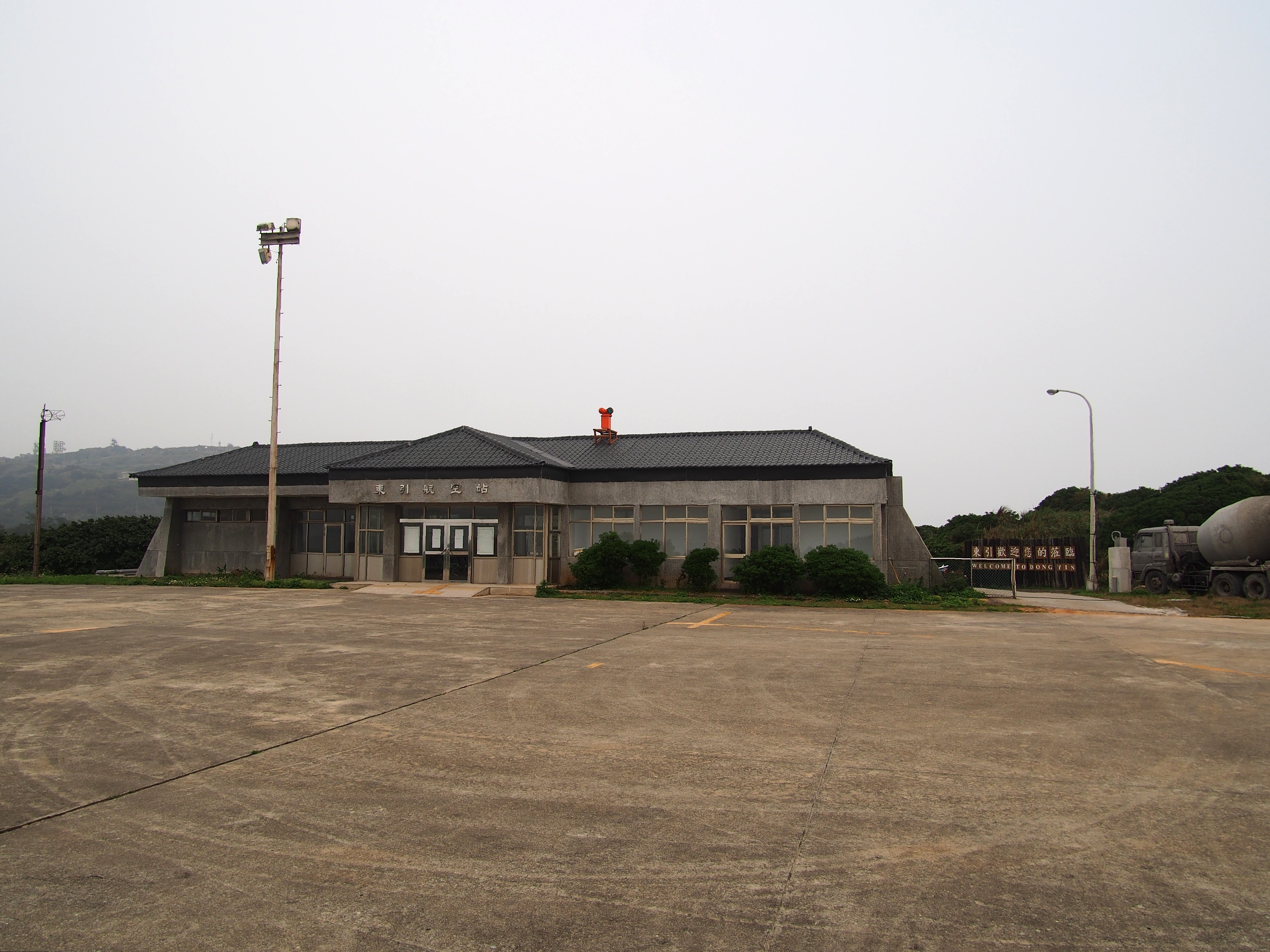
Dongyin Heliport

Dongyin can be reached by ferry from Nangan or Keelung in Taiwan arriving at Zhongzhu Harbor.

Local transportation around Dongyin are taxis and scooters since the area doesn't have public buses. Dongyin can be explored by foot due to its relatively flat terrain.

== Destinations ==
=== Dongyong Lighthouse ===
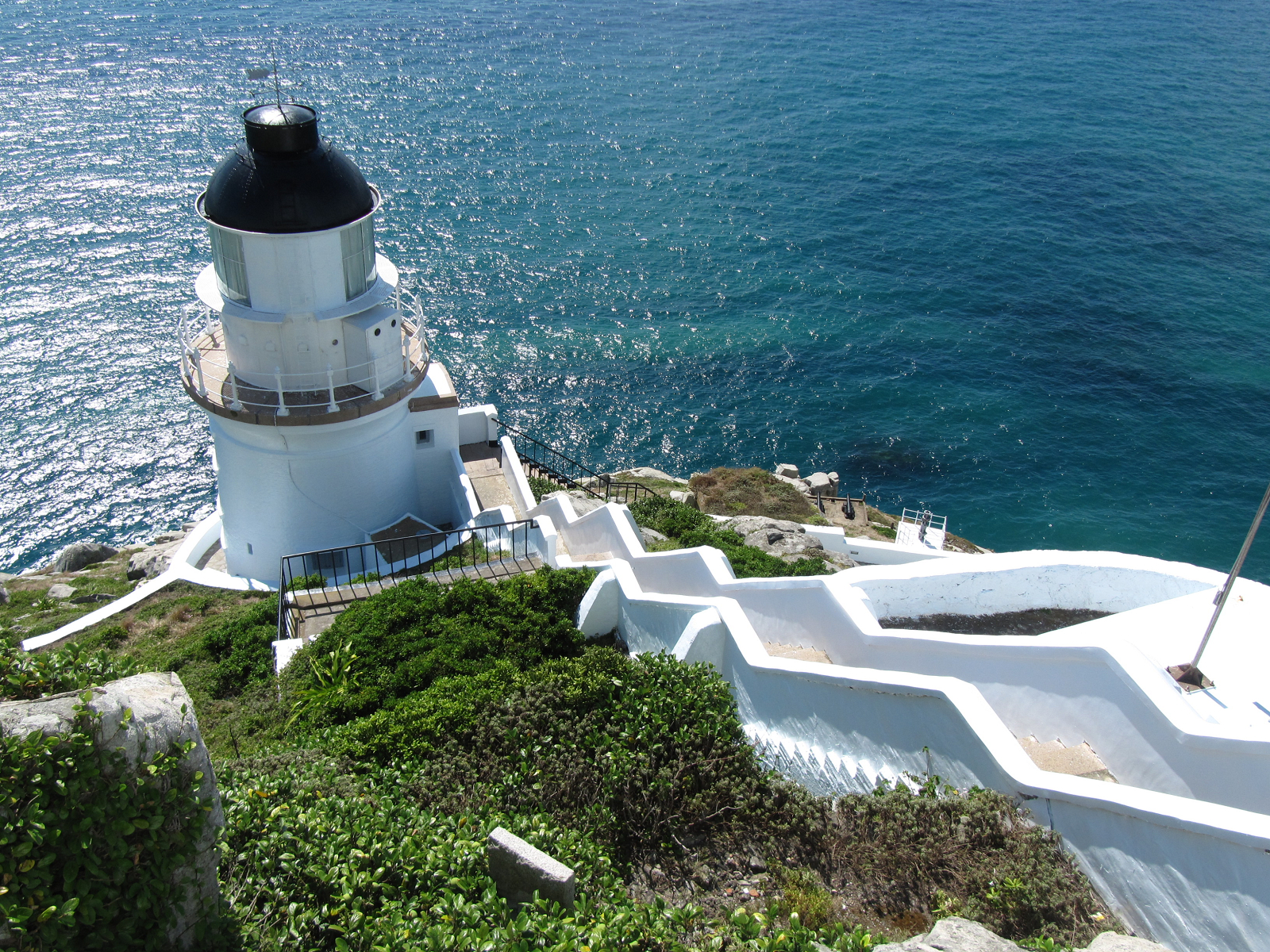
Dongyong Lighthouse

Planning for Dongyong Lighthouse began in 1902 (the 27th year of Qing dynasty Guangxu Emperor Era (清光緒)). In 1988, Ministry of the Interior rated it as third-class protected historical site. Towering up the sheer and precipitous cliffs, the grand white lighthouse and the blue sea are intertwined. Due to its European architecture style, Dongyong Lighthouse is also called Dongyin Villa (東引別墅). Under the lighthouse are two fog cannons, and now a newly added foghorn, a replacement for fog cannons, which all aid navigation during fog season.

=== Suicide Cliff ===
Suicide Cliff is made up of cliff erosion and sea gulfs, sitting about a hundred metres above main sea level. Downwards from the observatory, slapping waves in the deep valley are thrilling and soul-stirring.

It is said that in Qing Dynasty a fisherman's wife was kidnapped by mobsters to this island. Resisting, she escaped to this cliff, jumped off, and died. To commemorate her chastity, this cliff is named Suicide Cliff.

=== A Thread of Sky ===
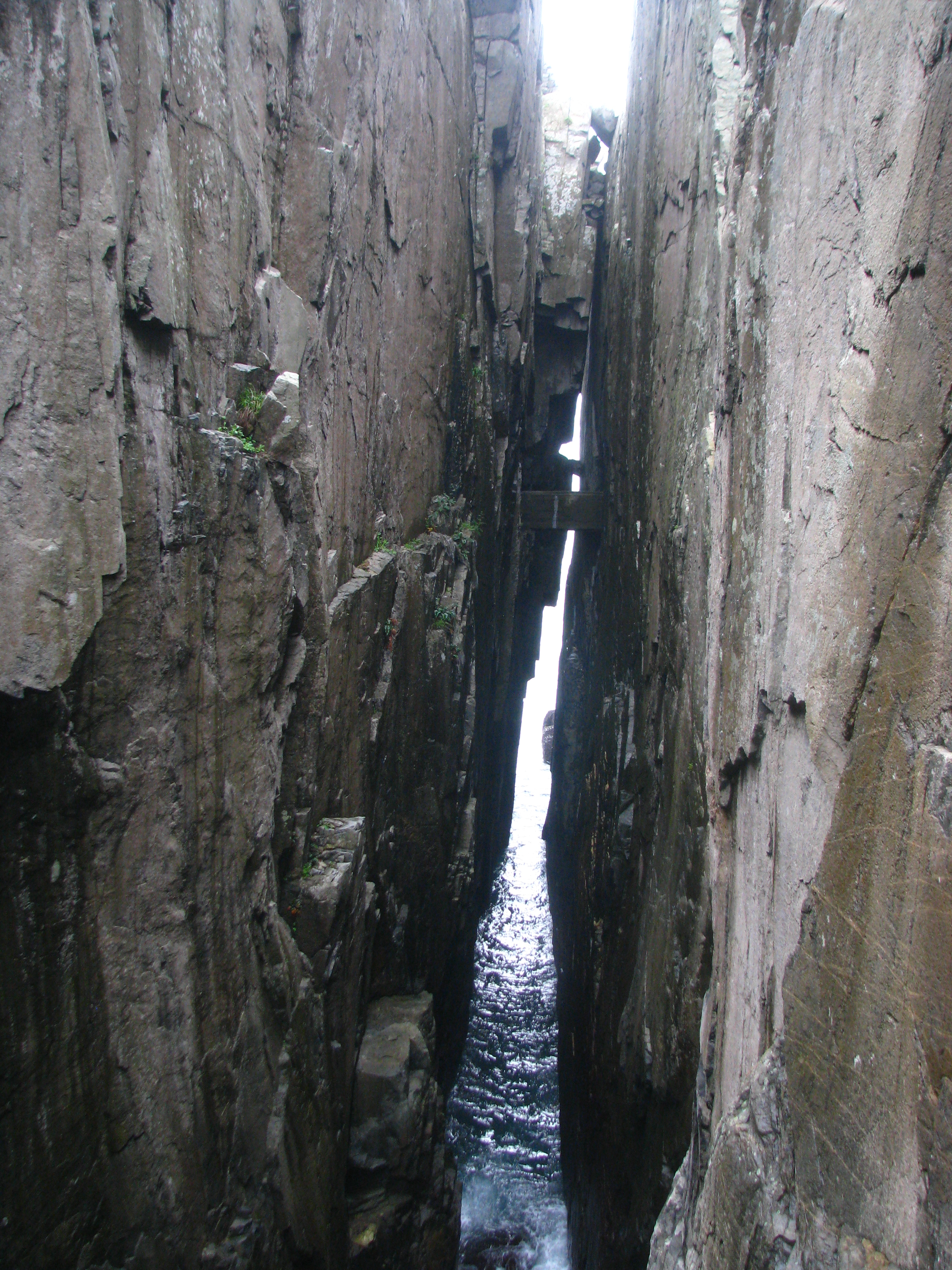
A Thread of Sky

Situated in the west cape of Heaven King Port (天王澳) in Dongyin, is a cliff erosion. Along two sides of the meandering combat trenches are bristly banners. Setting foot at the observatory after a short walk, just to see the whole sea and sky are squeezed into the perpendicular gap between the rocks. Waves rush into the narrow chasm, taking away rock little by little, creating a marvel of nature. Four inscribed words on the cliff wall, 'Sky Cleft Hark Waves' was given by General Ming-Tang Lai.

=== Andong Tunnel ===
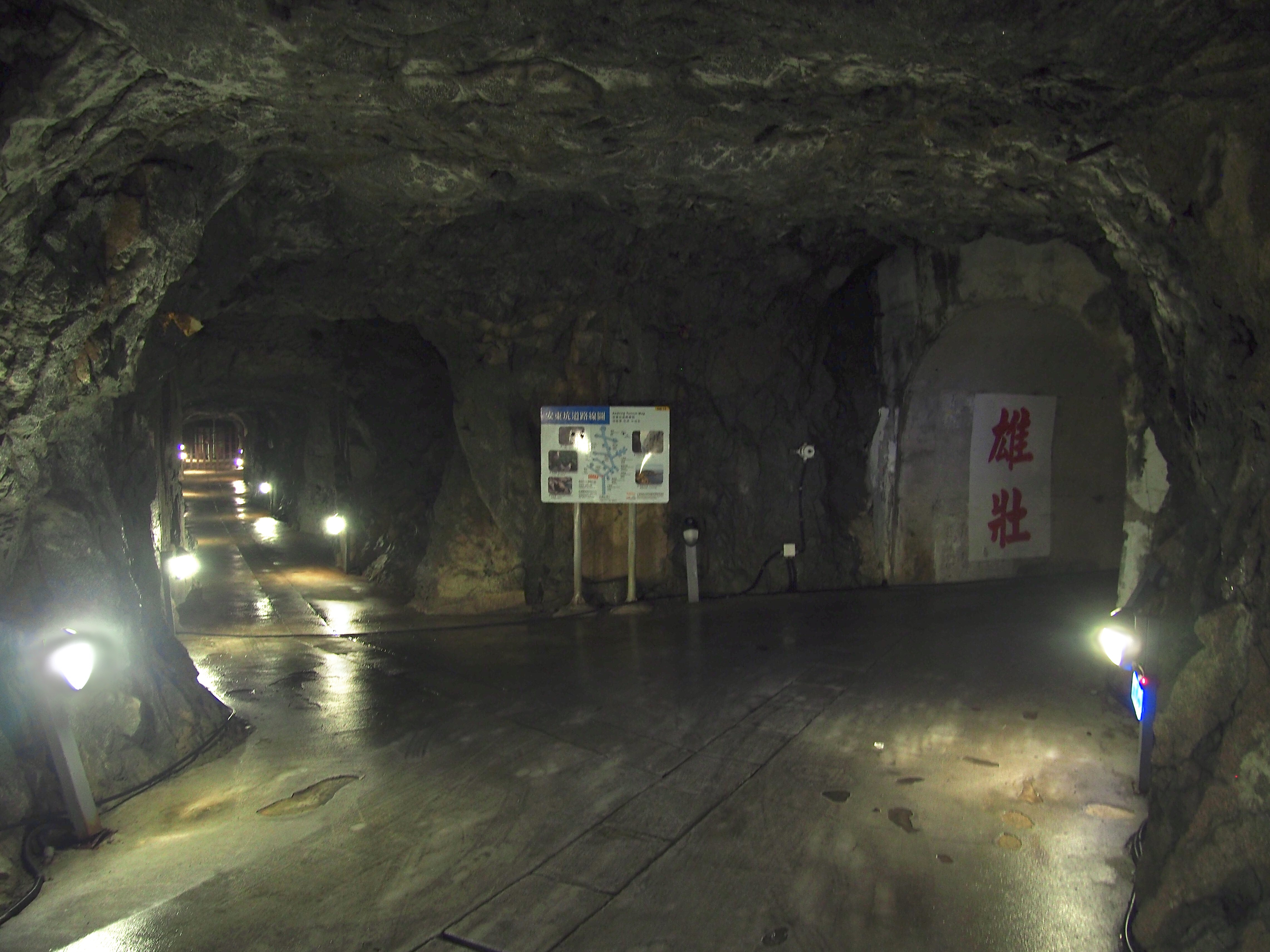
Andong Tunnel

Next to the command post is Andong Tunnel, a massive construction project with uncanny workmanship. Inside the tunnels are fully equipped with bedrooms, an ammunition depot, Zhongshan room (中山室), bathrooms and even a pigsty. Along the walls outside of the eight outlets of the tunnels is a gathering spot for Larus crassirostris (黑尾鷗), which breed every spring and summer.

=== Mountain Facing Guanyin ===
At the foot of the east hill of Mt. Enai (恩愛山) and the west of Shaoziao (小紫澳), the straight up huge stone is named Mountain Facing Guanyin (朝山觀音). From at sea, the stone looks like a cross-legged Guanyin, but it looks like a standing Guanyin facing the mountain, when seen from the mountains.

It is documented in Dongyin chronicles that when the cloud-flying Putuo (普陀) Guanyin was hunting a goblin, it trailed to the island. Seeing the goblin run into the chasm and become trapped, Guanyin cast a spell and took the surrendered goblin back to the South China Sea. The statue is here for later generations to pay respect and ponder.

=== Dongyin Distillery ===
Dongyin Distillery (東引酒廠) was founded in 1961 and has been the most important business on the island. Dongyin Distillery is on the same latitude, 26 N, as another three distilleries, Mao Tai, Luzhou Tequ Liquor (瀘州老窖) and Wuliangye Liquor (五糧液). The indispensable conditions to produce fine liquor are optimal humidity and temperature, microorganisms for fermentation, and spring water rich in maifanite (麥飯石) granite. Dongyin Distillery claims that 'Dongyong Liquor Outperforms Mao Tai'. (東湧陳高勝賽茅台)

=== Yanxiu Tidal Echo ===
Yanxiu Tidal Echo (Yansiou Echoing with Tidal Cave) (燕秀潮音) is behind the frogman troops of the special forces post. The term 'Yenshow' (燕秀) means "swallow nests" in Matsu dialect. Yansiou Echoing with Tidal Cave is a typical sea cove, at the bottom of which is a crevice connected to the sea. Yansiou Echoing with Tidal Cave is known to the resonant sounds caused by waves slapping against the rocks. After a stroll to the top observatory, the view expands. Towards the east is the Laoshu (Rat) Sands Stone Forest (老鼠沙石林).

=== Beihai Tunnel ===
The 148-meter long Beihai Tunnel is in the west of Yansiouao (燕秀澳) in Dongyin. It used to accommodate several cutters, but was abandoned after severe damage caused by a typhoon. It was reopened to the public after restoration in 2000. Inside the tunnel is equipped with trails and railings. At the end of the tunnel, eight statues of the construction workers commemorate the restoration.

=== Dragon Sea Cave ===
Dragon Sea Cave (海現龍闕) is located in the south of Beiao (北澳) and under the Dongyin gas station. After long years of erosion, exposed black basalt bedrock forms a unique 'sea arch' (海蝕門). When huge waves roll up, or during the fog season, the image of the sea arch flickers in the waves and fog, like a black mythical dragon playing in the water. Therefore, Dragon Sea Cave is nicknamed 'Marine Dragon Play at Sea' (潛龍鬧海).

=== Ganen Pavilion ===
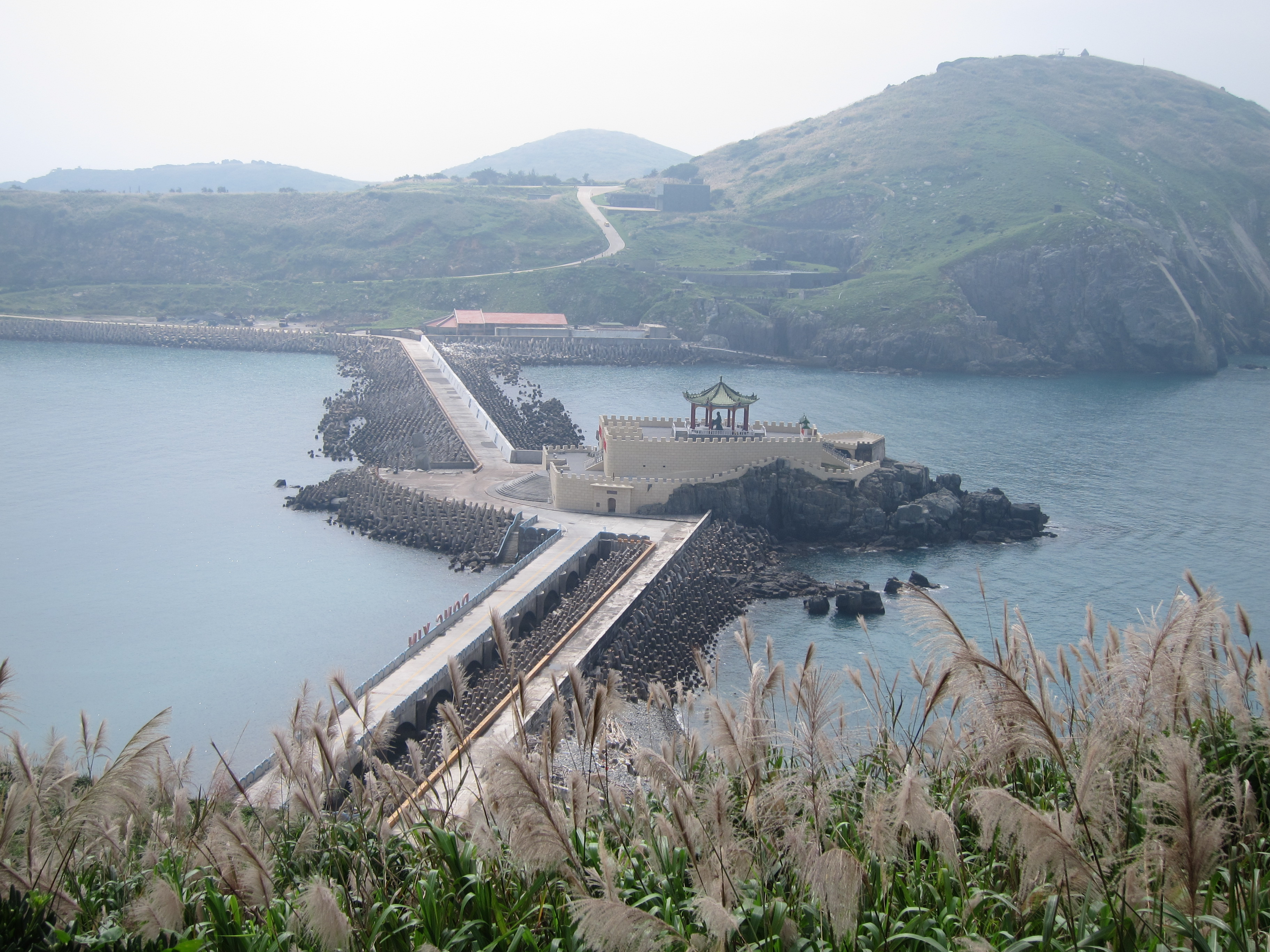
Ganen Pavilion ('Thanksgiving Pavilion')

When the tide ebbs, the stack standing in between connects Dongyin and Xiyin (Siyin), but standing alone at sea when the tide refluxes. An embankment was built in 1986 to link Dongyin and Xiyin (Siyin). To show their gratitude for the grand construction, the troops and inhabitants on the island built a pavilion on the stack, with a sitting statue of Chiang Ching-kuo inside.

=== Crouching Crocodile ===
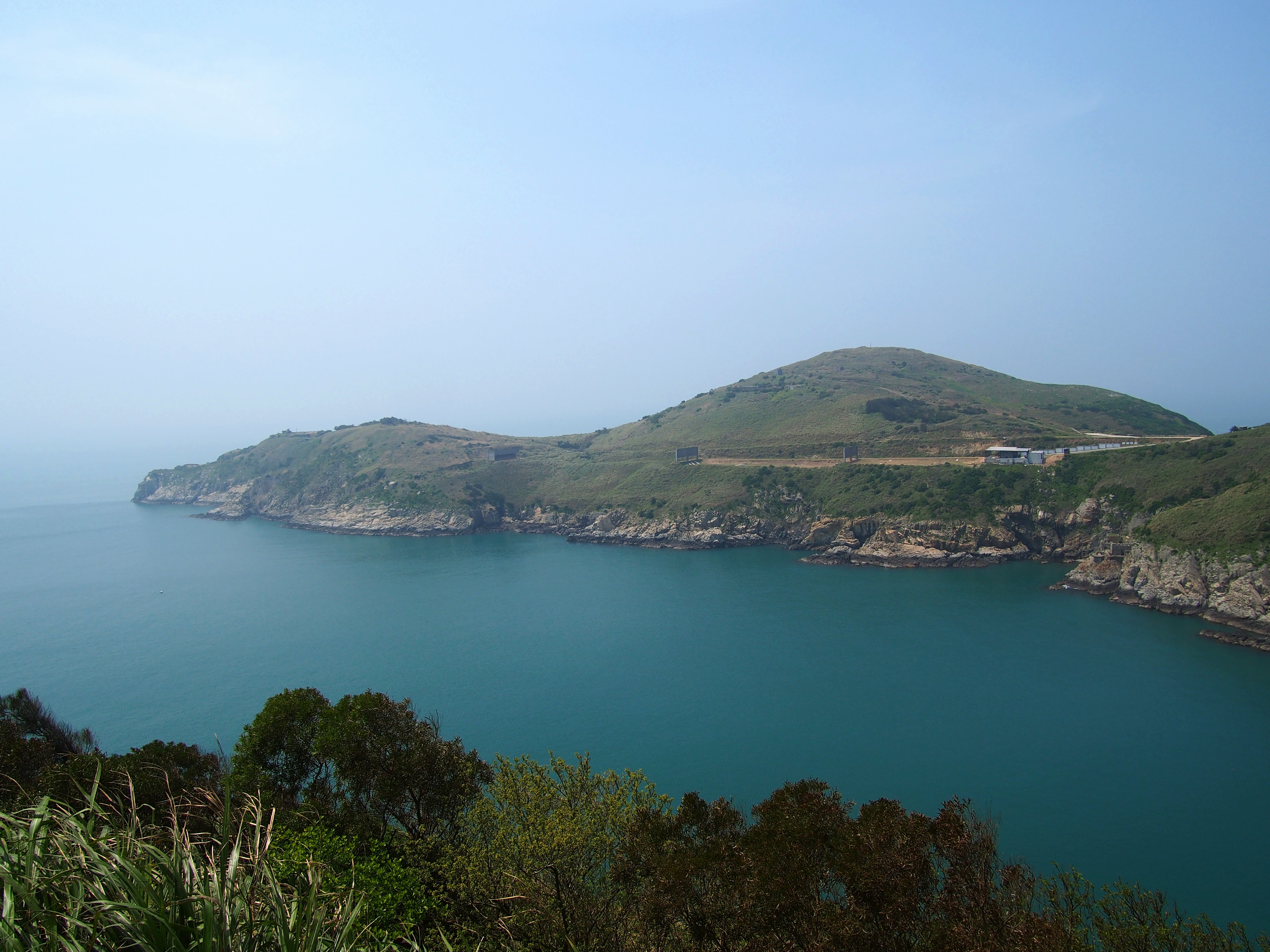
Crouching Crocodile

In the west of Qingshuiao (Cingshueiao) (清水澳) of Xiyin (Siyin) is Reclining Alligator Island (鱷魚島), named after its likeness of an alligator in repose. Legend has it that a fierce alligator had caused trouble for many years at Cingshueiao. The Jade emperor recited a spell and turned it into a stone.

When it comes to a visit in Xiyin (Siyin), the best position to enjoy the sight of Reclining Alligator Island is along the high way and of the east of Cingshueiao. Towards the west, both Reclining Alligator Island and the oceanic scenery of Cingshueiao are in a full view.

=== Dongao ===
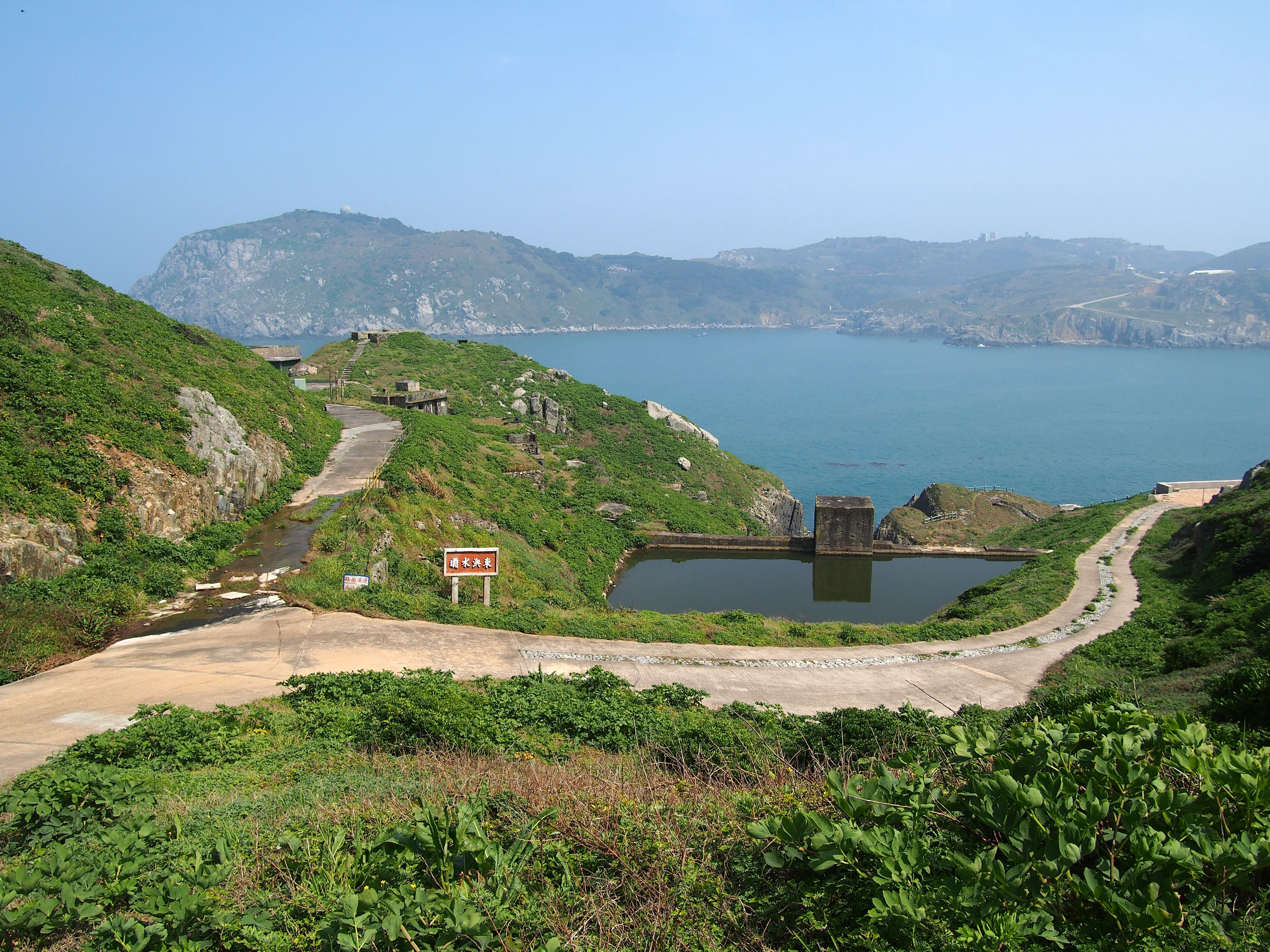
Dongao

Dongao (東澳) is a port located in the east of Siyin, facing Beiao (北澳) of Dongyin in distance. Before the jetties were built between Dongyin and Xiyin (Siyin), Dongao was one of the important transportation hubs on Xiyin (Siyin).

Lack of vast tidal flats in Dongyin, the pebble beach in Dongao is one of few ports that give easy access to the sea. It's the best spot to enjoy the sights of coastal landforms, such as sea arches, sea gulfs, cliffs, and wave-cut platforms.

=== Houao ===
Houao (Hauao) (后澳) is on the windward side against the North Wind. The hills are all covered with grass, maintaining ecological primitiveness. Representative native plant species can be found on this immense hillside, such as Lycoris radiata Herb (紅花石蒜), Lycoris sprengeri (紅藍石蒜), Guizotia abyssinica (油菊), and Pittosporum (海桐), and so on. In addition, Hauao is the scenic spot where the most abundant geological features can be found in Dongyin. All different forms of cliff erosion can be easily spotted here, including sea arches, sea stacks, and sea coves.

=== The Northernmost Frontier ===
Walking towards the west from Houao (Hauao) (后澳), passing a 200-meter wide concrete path, here comes the northernmost tip of the territory of R.O.C. (Taiwan), Northernmost Frontier (國之北疆). In 2006, it was developed into a scenic spot and a stone monument inscribed with Northernmost Frontier (國之北疆) was erected. Since then, it has become a must-see for tourists visiting Dongyin. Out from the observatory, the north is the endless sea, and the west is the Luohanping (Lohan Flat) (羅漢坪), aka Three-Colored Stone (三色石).

=== Monk Reading the Scripture ===
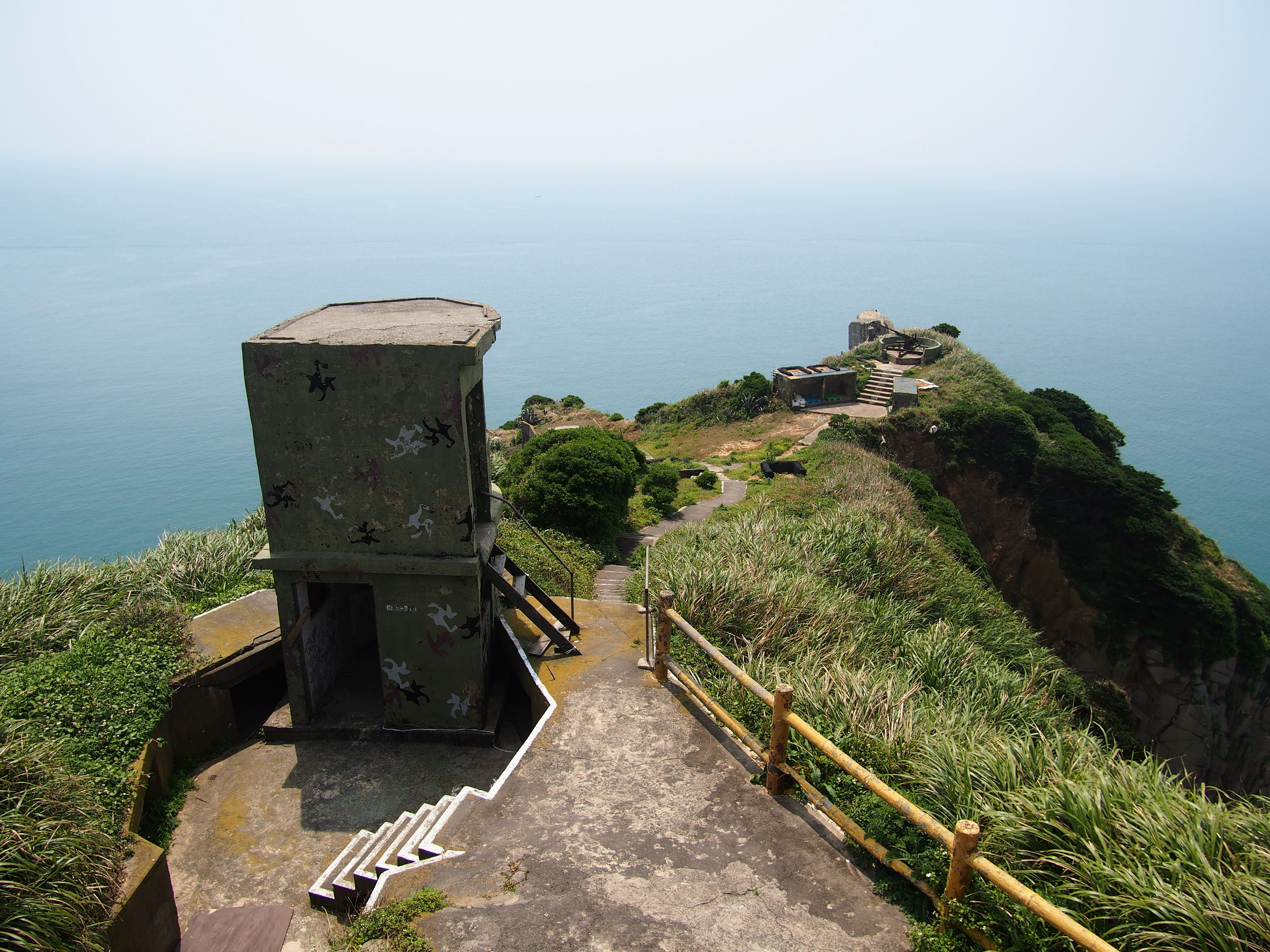
Stronghold No. 26

Monk Reading the Scripture (和尚看經) is at Stronghold No. 26 (兩六據點) in Xiyin (Siyin). Facing Zhongzhu Harbor, the huge stone on the hillside stands erect, as if it were a monk, reading Tipitaka scripture, indifferent to the mundane matters. Therefore, it's called 'Monk Reading the Scripture'.

Army is still stationed at Stronghold No.26. Tourists are not allowed to enter. At dusk, looking towards the west on Dongyin, there are views of Monk Reading the Scripture in sight and rays of evening sunlight in the backdrop.

== Ecology ==
=== Gulls and terns ===
Dongyin is located to the southwest of the Zhoushan Archipelago, one of the three world-class fisheries. The nearby water has an influx of cold and warm ocean currents, creating ideal conditions for both fish and birds: gulls and terns in particular breed on the cliffs of the islands.

==== Black-tailed gull (Larus crassirostris) ====
The black-tailed gull is about 45 cm long and is the most common in Dongyin. Nationalist soldiers stationed on the island following the end of the Chinese civil war in 1949 used the image of the bird on their badges and the Dongyin Distillery (東引酒廠) takes it as a symbol.

In the summer, black-tailed gulls number in their thousands. Most build nests on the steep cliffs at Rat Sands (老鼠沙) and outside the former artillery tunnel, Andong Tunnel (安東坑道). The June-to-August breeding season is a much-visited tourist attraction.

==== Black-naped tern (Sterna sumatrana) ====
The black-naped tern is the most commonly spotted summer migrant bird to the Matsu Islands. They usually rest on three uninhabited islands, Twins Reef (雙子礁), Sole Cap (獨角帽) and Lotus Reef (芙蓉礁).

==== Bridled tern (Onychoprion anaethetus) ====
Bridled terns mostly roost on three uninhabited islands, Twins Reef (雙子礁), Sole Cap (獨角帽), and Lotus Reef (芙蓉礁) in Xiyin (Siyin).

=== Plant species ===
In Dongyin, there are copious native plant species, in total 83 suborders 170 families and 198 species, including numerous precious ornamental and medical ones. Originally from Japan, Heteropappus ciliosus (華南狗娃花) hasn't been found in Taiwan and China. Dianthus superbus var. longicalycinus (長萼瞿麥) is widespread in medium to high altitude areas, but is found in Donyin at an altitude less than 200 meters. Both Lycoris radiata Herb (紅花石蒜), rarely seen in Taiwan, and Lycoris sprengeri (紅藍石蒜), only endemic to Dongyin among the Matsu Islands, have become important assets for tourism. Clear cutting once caused the hard-but-light slow-growing Eurya emarginata (Thunb.) Makino (濱柃木) to near-extinction. Now it is classified as a conservation species.

==== Lycoris radiata ====
Lycoris radiata herb (紅花石蒜), within the family Amaryllidaceae (石蒜科), is about 30–70 cm tall, bearing a terminal of four to seven flowers. The petals are extremely wrinkled and rolled backwards. The thrums and styles are long and slender. The pollination period spans about 2 months from August to September annually. Lycoris radiata is broadly distributed on the hillsides of Mt. Shiwei (世尾山), Mt. Enai (恩愛山) in Dongyin, Dongao (東澳), Qingshuiao (Cingshueiao) (清水澳), and Dragon Boat Sands (龍船沙) in Xiyin (Siyin). Flamboyant flowers are hard to miss.

In 2006, Lycoris radiata was elected by the inhabitants 'County Flower', as a replacement for bougainvillea (九重葛) in the martial law enforcement period.

==== Lycoris sprengeri ====
The flowers of Lycoris sprengeri (紅藍石蒜), also named Matsu stone garlic (馬祖石蒜), are pink with a blue tint. The leaves are 58 cm long and 1.3 cm broad. The cup-shaped flowers are elegant. The pollination period of Lycoris sprengeri is a month earlier than Lycoris radiata. In the Matsu Islands, Lycoris sprengeri occurs only in Dongyin and Xiyin (Siyin), and is already classified as a conservation species.

From June to August, dotted Lycoris sprengeri creates a picturesque landscape as swayed by the wind. Lycoris sprengeri is broadly distributed throughout Mt. Shiwei (世尾山), Mt. Enai (恩愛山) in Dongyin, Dongao(東澳), Qingshuiao (Cingshueiao) (清水澳), and Dragon Boat Sands (龍船沙) in Xiyin (Siyin).

==== Scilla scilloides ====
Scilla scilloides (棉棗兒), within the Liliaceae (百合), bears a terminal raceme of pink small flowers. It is said to resemble a fox's tail. The shape of Scilla scilloides is elegant. In Northern Taiwan, Scilla scilloides occupies habitats under 700 meters high in a small amount. From July to August, Scilla scilloides can be easily spotted on the open hillsides or fields along the roads in Dongyin and Xiyin (Siyin).

Scilla scilloides also can be found in Nangan (Matsu Island), but the majority is in Dongyin and Xiyin (Siyin). NTU Professor suggests Scilla scilloides be a listed candidate for 'Township Flower' in Dongyin.

==== Dianthus superbus var. longicalycinus ====
Dianthus superbus var. longicalycinus (長萼瞿麥), within family Caryophyllaceae (石竹科), simply looks like wild Dianthus (石竹). Dianthus can be recognized by their rather ragged edges of petals and long calyxes connected to petals. Most flowers are pink and blue. The huge amount of Dianthus gives an impression of the endemic plant in the Matsu Islands. However, Dianthus, though not common, can also be found in Taiwan.

The pollination period of Dianthus is long, from early summer to winter. The blossom period lasts for half a year. They grow in a large quantity in the wild and along the roadsides in Dongyin. Dianthus is also to be found.

==== Heteropappus ciliosus ====
Heteropappus ciliosus has not been found in Taiwan. Due to the special geography of Dongyin in proximity to the Mainland China, Heteropappus ciliosus is one of the valuable assets. Heteropappus ciliosus grows snugly close to the ground. The colors of the tongue-shaped flowers are violet, pink and white, with yellow tube-shaped bulb in the middle, while the violet and pink ones are more commonly seen.

The annual blossom season of Heteropappus ciliosus is when the terns (燕鷗) emigrate at the end of summer. The eye-catching violet Heteropappus ciliosus enriches the wild. Heteropappus ciliosus is widely distributed at Dongyong Lighthouse (東湧燈塔), Suicide Cliff (烈女義坑) and Houao (后澳).

==== Eurya emarginata (Thunb.) Makino ====
Eurya emarginata (Thunb.) Makino, scientific name Eurya japonica Thunb. (凹葉柃木), is also nicknamed 'Matsu purple sandalwood' (馬祖紫檀). Eurya is an evergreen species, resistant to cold and salt. As the dominant plant, slow growing Eurya is primarily distributed on the barren slopes of coastal cliffs. The surface of the leaves is smooth and hard, with serrated edges.

Eurya (濱柃木) is adapted to the fierce northeast monsoon, demonstrating elegant tree formations. In the past, local soldiers and inhabitants often used Eurya for wands or chops on account of its light and hard texture. At some point, Eurya was threatened with disappearance. Thanks to the reevaluation and attention from the researchers and local government, Eurya is now classified as a conservation species. While visiting Yanxiu Tidal Echo (Yansiou Echoing with Tidal Cave) (燕秀潮音), tourists can spot the unbending and graceful Eurya.

== Gallery ==
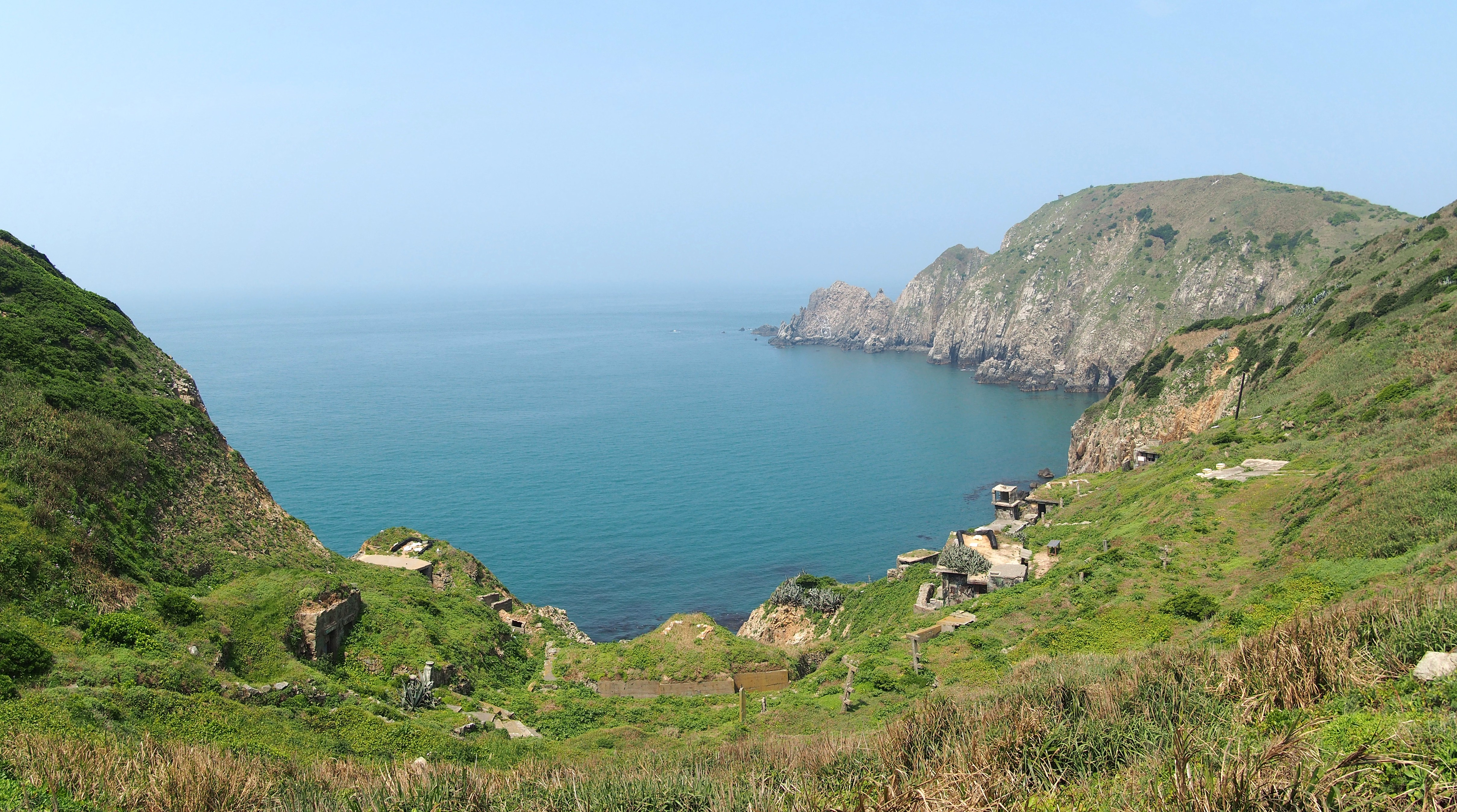
Abandoned Stonghold

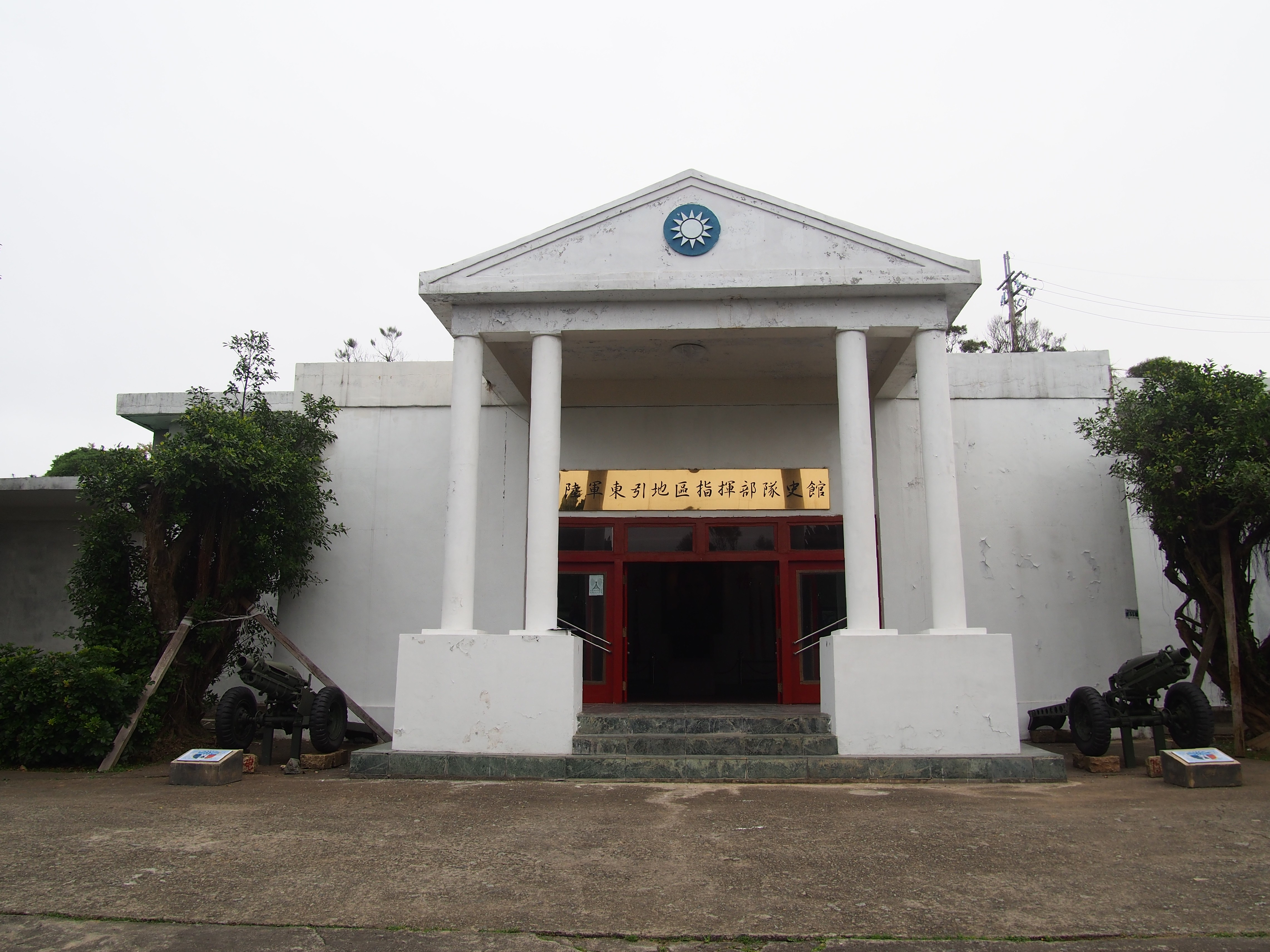
Anti-Communist National Salvation Army History Museum

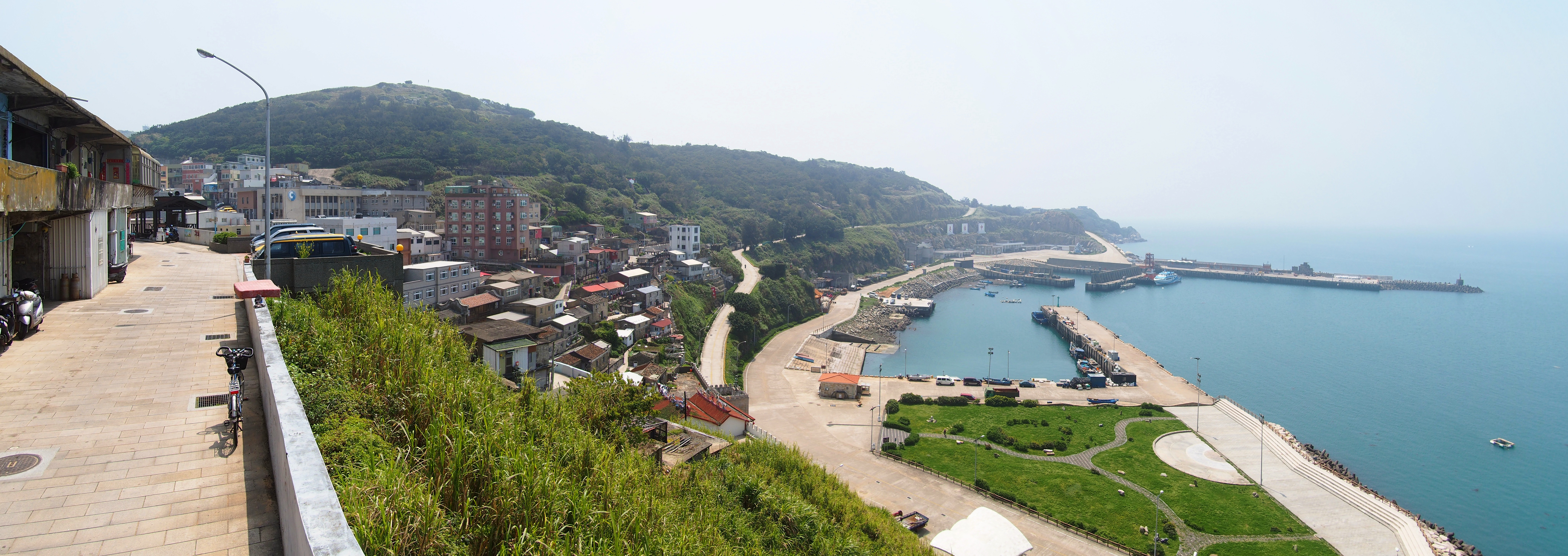
Zhongliu Village and Zhongzhu Harbor

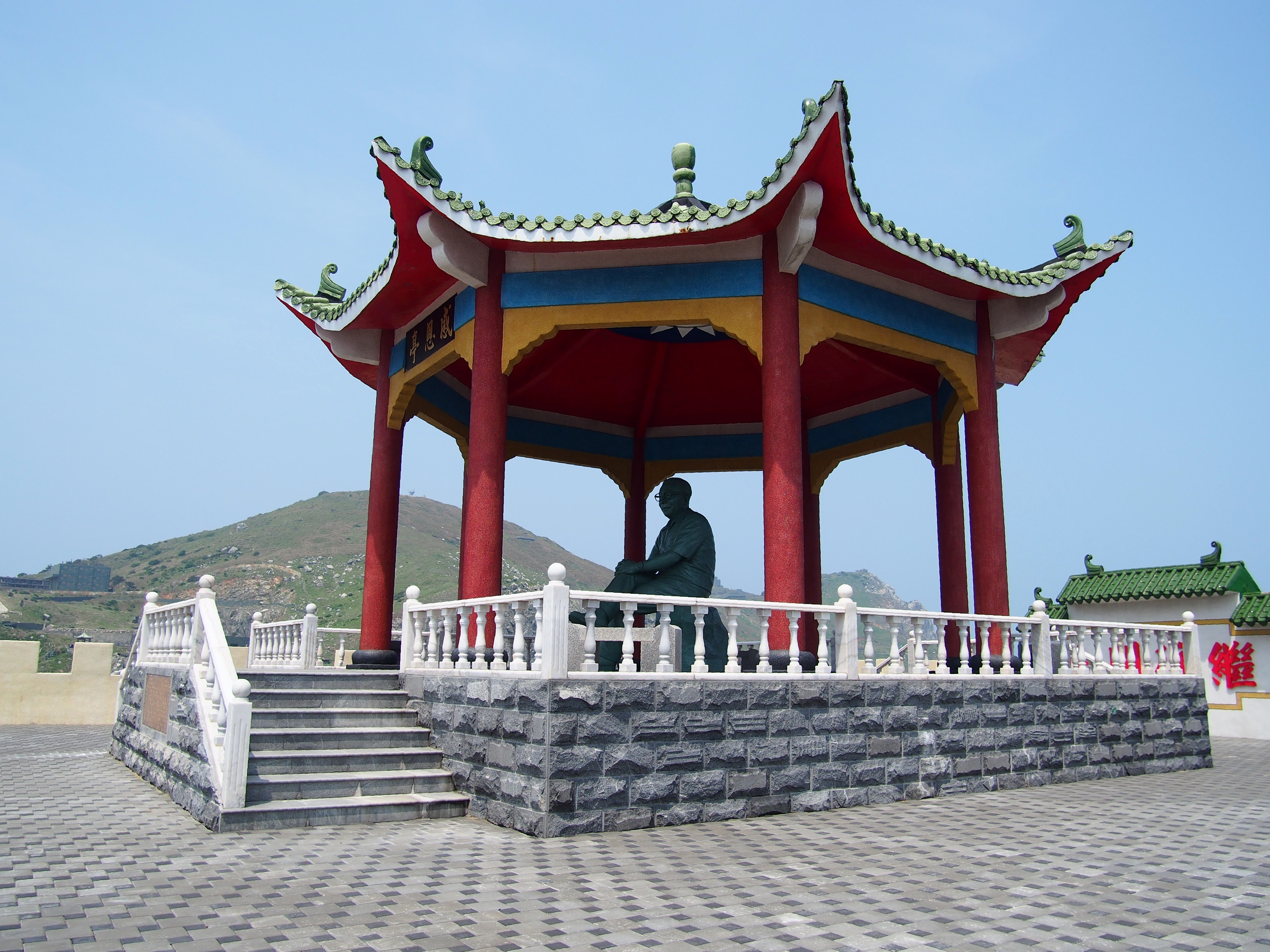
Statue of Chiang Ching-kuo in Ganen Pavilion

== See also ==
- Zhongliu Tianhou Temple
- List of islands of the Republic of China
- List of Taiwanese superlatives
- List of islands in the East China Sea
- Baselines of the Chinese territorial sea
