= Zhongzhu Harbor =

Harbor in Dongyin, Lienchiang, Taiwan

Zhongzhu Harbor 中柱港
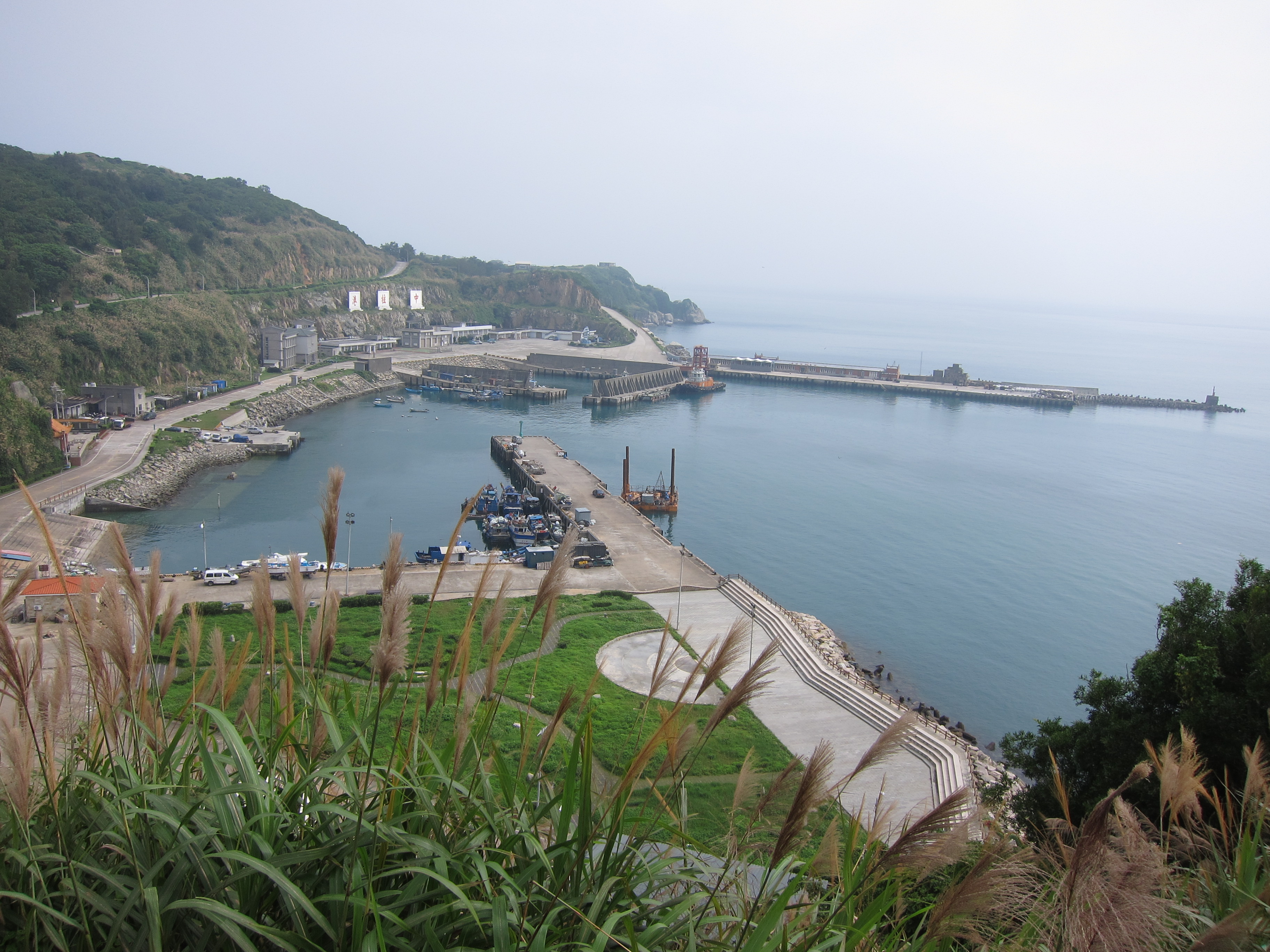
- Interactive map of Zhongzhu Harbor 中柱港
- Location within Taiwan

Location
- Location: Dongyin, Lienchiang, Taiwan
- Coordinates: 26°21′49.9″N 120°29′03.6″E

Details
- Type of Harbor: port

The Zhongzhu Harbor (Chinese: 中柱港; pinyin: Zhōngzhù Gǎng) is a port in Lehua Village, Dongyin Township, Lienchiang County, Taiwan. It is the main port for people to get in and out from Dongyin Island.

== History ==
The harbor was constructed by the Republic of China Armed Forces. They used rock blasted out to build a levee at the northern part of the harbor, connecting Dongyin Island and Xiyin Island.

== Architecture ==
Next to the harbor is the giant Chinese characters pictures showing that people are at Lehua Village.

== Destinations ==
Boats departing from this harbor departs to Fu'ao Harbor in Nan'gan Township.

== See also ==
- Transportation in Taiwan
