= Dongnanjiao Island =

Island in Zhejiang, China

Coordinates: 30°43.5′N 123°09.7′E

Dongnanjiao Island (东南礁) is located in the northeast corner of Zhoushanqundao (Zhoushan Islands), 76 km from Shengsi County. It is part of the Shengsi County of Zhoushan city.

Dongnanjiao Island is the baseline point of the Chinese territorial sea.

== See also ==
- Zhoushanqundao (Zhoushan Islands) (舟山群岛)
- Suyanjiao (Suyan Rock) (苏岩礁)
- Sheshandao (Sheshan Island) (佘山岛)
- Liangxiongdiyu (Liangxiongdi Island) (两兄弟屿)
- Yushanliedao (Yushan Islands) (渔山列岛)
