= Waikejiao =

Island in Jiangsu, China

Coordinates: 33°00′54″N 121°38′24″E

- Traditional Chinese: 外磕腳
- Simplified Chinese: 外磕脚
Transcriptions
Standard Mandarin
- Hanyu Pinyin: Wàikējiǎo
- Wade–Giles: Wai-k'o-chiao

Waikejiao is a small sand island in the East China Sea east of Dongtai administered as part of Jiangsu Province, China. Macaiheng is close by.

Waikejiao is one of the baseline points of the Chinese territorial sea.

== See also ==
- Macaiheng
- Sheshandao
