= Sheshan Island =

Island in Shanghai, China

Coordinates: 31°25′18″N 122°14′36″E

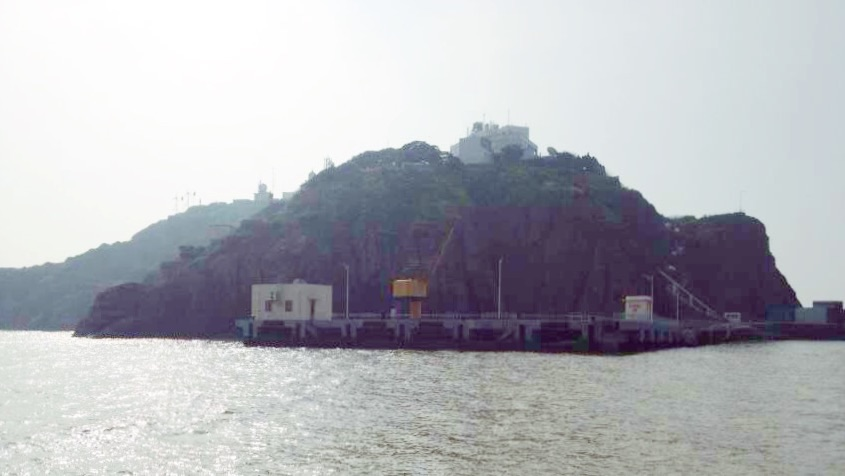
- Sheshan Island
- Interactive map of Sheshan Island

Geography
- Area: 3.7 ha (9.1 acres)

Administration
- People's Republic of China
- Municipality: Shanghai

Sheshan Island (simplified Chinese: 佘山岛; traditional Chinese: 佘山島; pinyin: Shéshān Dǎo) is located 35 km (22 mi) east of Chongming Island, in the estuary of the Yangtze River. The area is 0.037 km^{2} (0.014 sq mi).

The island is under the jurisdiction of the Shanghai Municipal Region and is guarded by the People's Liberation Army Navy. A 130-year-old lighthouse is located on the island. On November 1, 2005, the stele of "Chinese territorial sea baseline point" was erected.

== See also ==
- Waikejiao (外磕脚)
- Haijiao (海礁)
- List of islands in the East China Sea
