= Sansha (disambiguation) =

Sansha is a Chinese city on Yongxing Island in the South China Sea.

Sansha may also refer to:

- Sansha, a former island of the Yangtze estuary now joined to Chongming Island
- Sansha Town, Ningde City, Xiapu County, Fujian Province, China

== See also ==
- Sanshaw Gold Mine, in Red Lake, Ontario, Canada
