= Sanshaw Gold Mine =

Gold mine in Red Lake, Ontario, Canada

Coordinates: 51.0392°N 93.8153°W

Sanshaw Gold Mine was a gold mine that operated in the 1930s and 1940s in Red Lake, Ontario, in the Sanshaw-Red Lake deposit that subsequently became the Red Lake Mine one of the largest and most productive gold deposits in the world.

== Sanshaw Mines Limited ==
Sanshaw Mines Limited, incorporated in 1936, owned claims on White Horse Island, on Red Lake which was first staked by the Sanshaw Mines Syndicate. 15 diamond drill holes were drilled totalling 1160 m in 1936. Karl Brooks Heisey the President of Sanshaw Mines, Limited was the manager and driving force of the Sanshaw Gold Mine which was developed on White Horse Island during 1936–7. Heisey's crew uncovered a previously unknown well-mineralized shear and gold vein in 1936 which was the most important discovered up until that time in the Red Lake area. The Sanshaw Mine name was a pun on the name of John Whitman Shaw, who was a consulting mining engineer operating in the Red Lake area. The mine was proceeding with diamond drilling and sinking a shaft "sans" (i.e. without) Shaw. Shaw's nickname in the mining industry was "turn em down Shaw" referring to his lack of support for many new mine proposals. The White Horse Island discovery was one of the few in the Red Lake area that didn't use John Shaw's services.

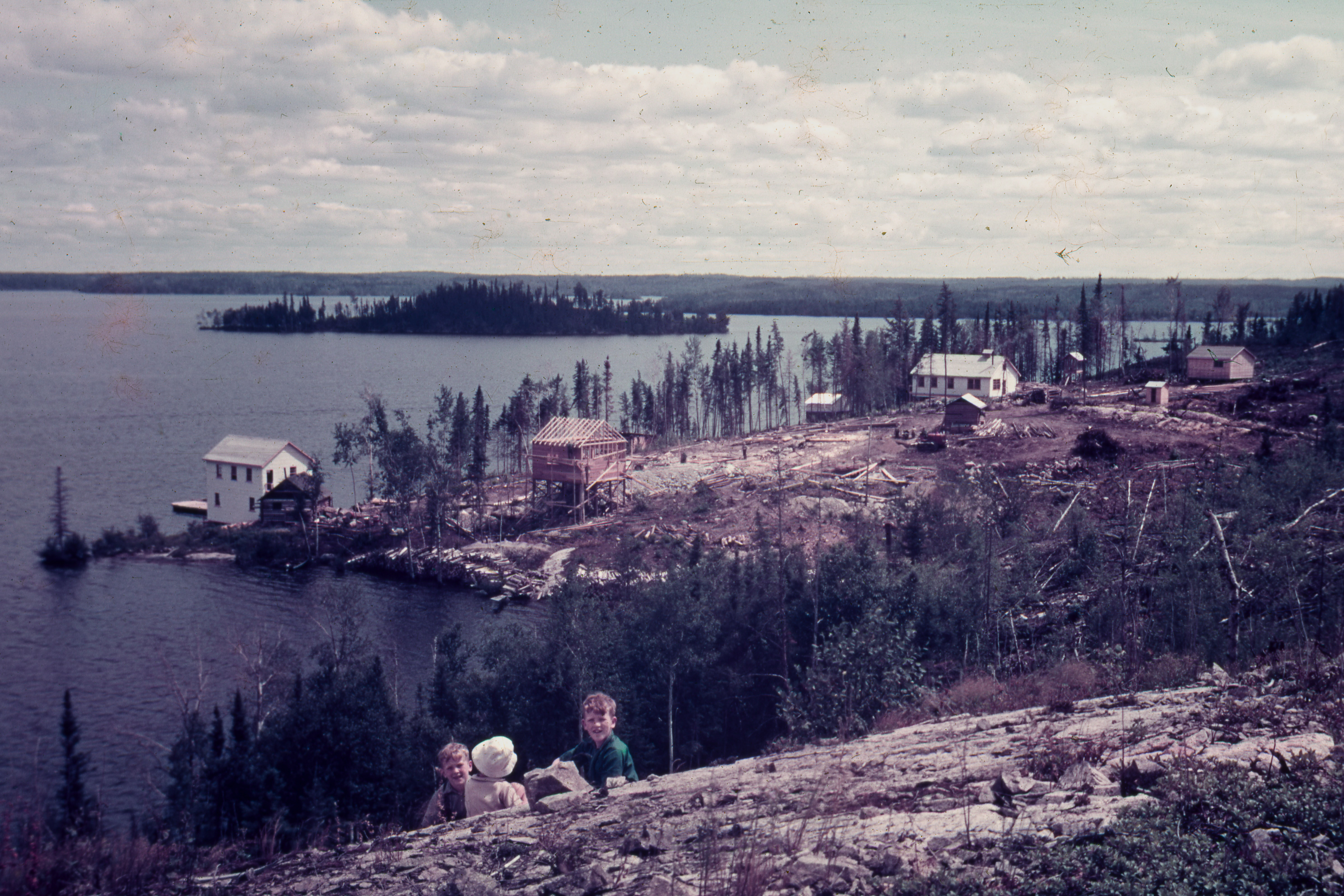
Sanshaw Mine, White Horse Island, Red Lake overlooking Hammell Channel. Heisey's children in foreground Lawrence Heisey, Karl Jr. wearing hat and Alan Milliken Heisey Sr.

== Mine Construction 1936-7 ==
During the years 1936-7 buildings constructed at the mine site included a bunk-house, two-storey office and warehouse, ice-house, cookery, directors' lodge, manager's residence, blacksmith shop, powder magazine, detonator-house and dry-house.

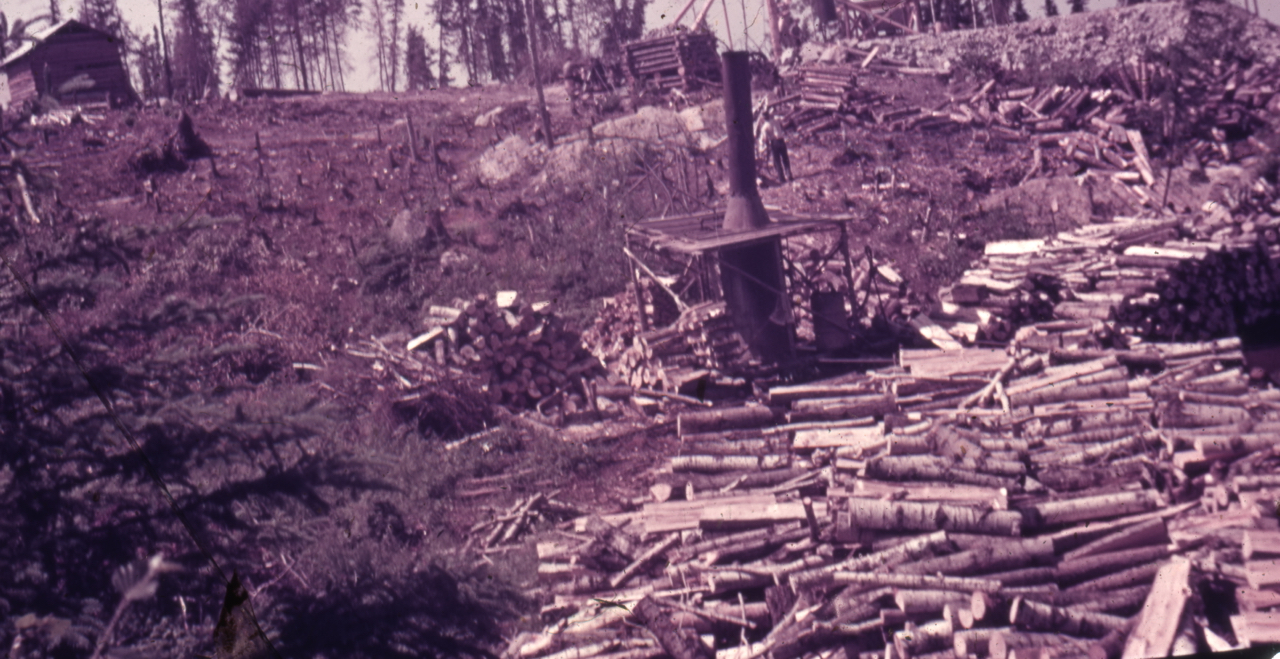
Clearing land & burning timber Sanshaw Mine 1936

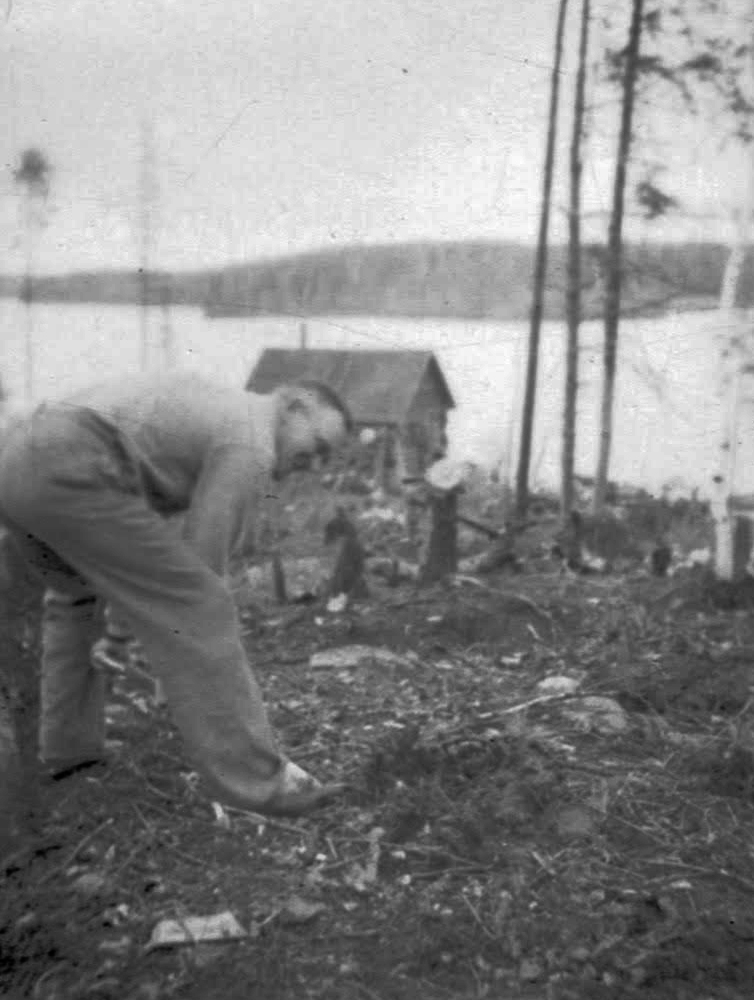
Heisey Clearing Land 1936

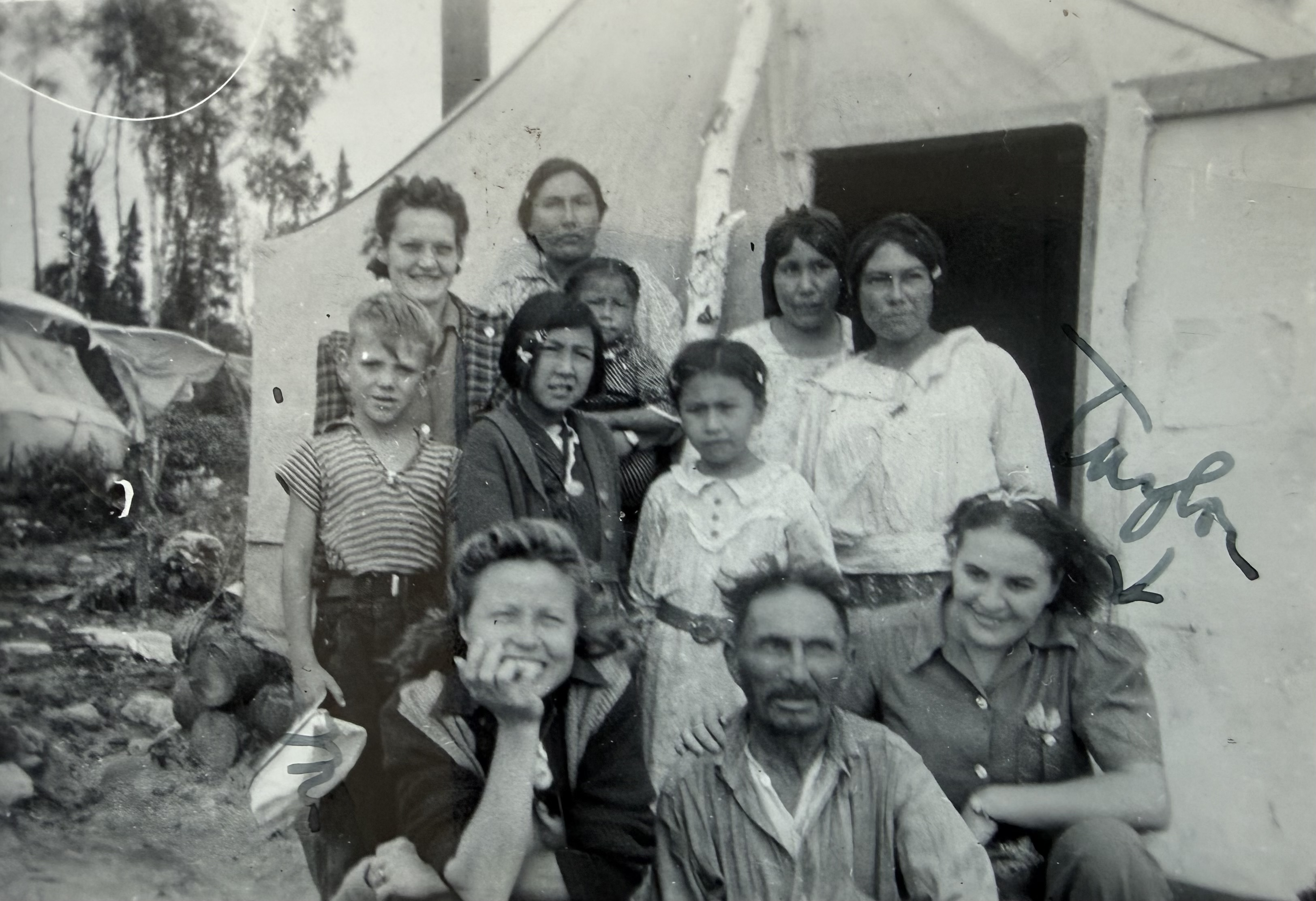
Native Workers & family, Jessie Taylor right Minnie Currie left Sanshaw 1936

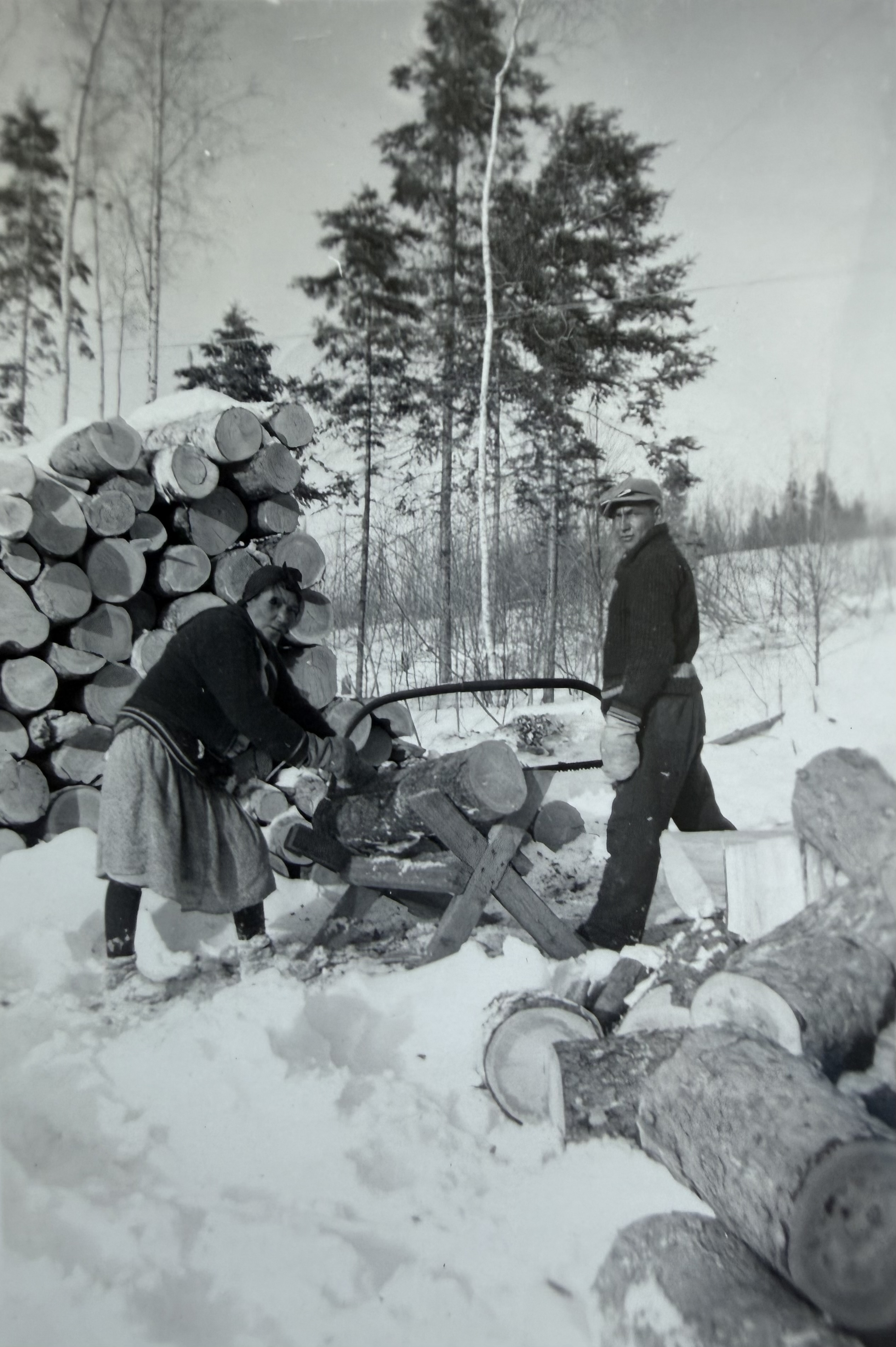
Native couple sawing firewood 1937 at Sanshaw Gold Mine

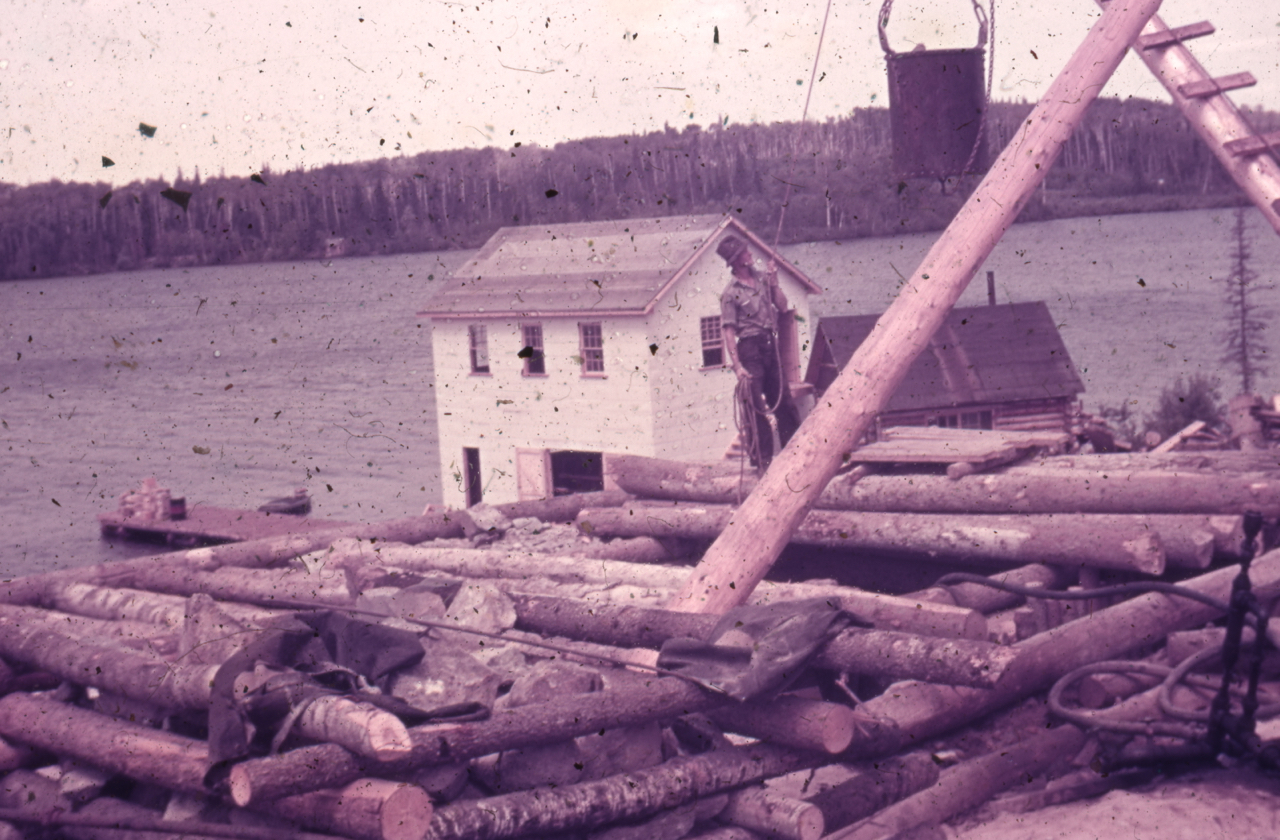
Mine Shaft & Warehouse Sanshaw Mine 1936

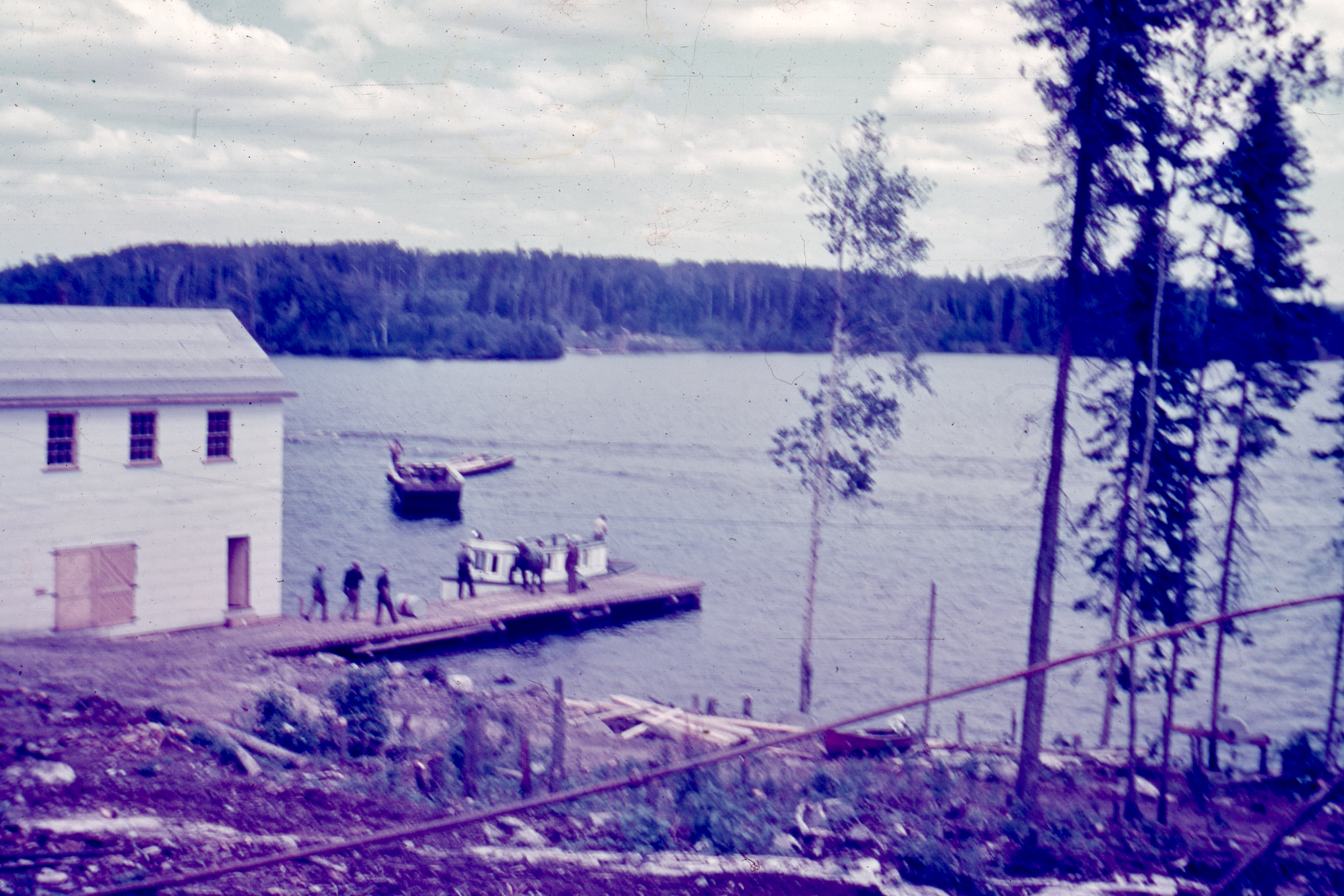
Warehouse Barge Delivery, Sanshaw Mine 1936

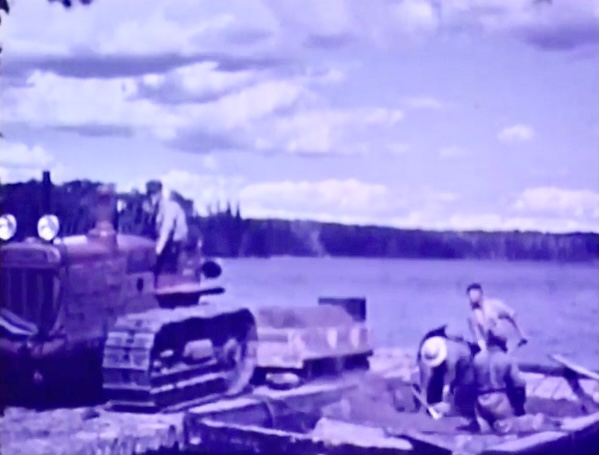
Loading Materials Sanshaw Mine 1936

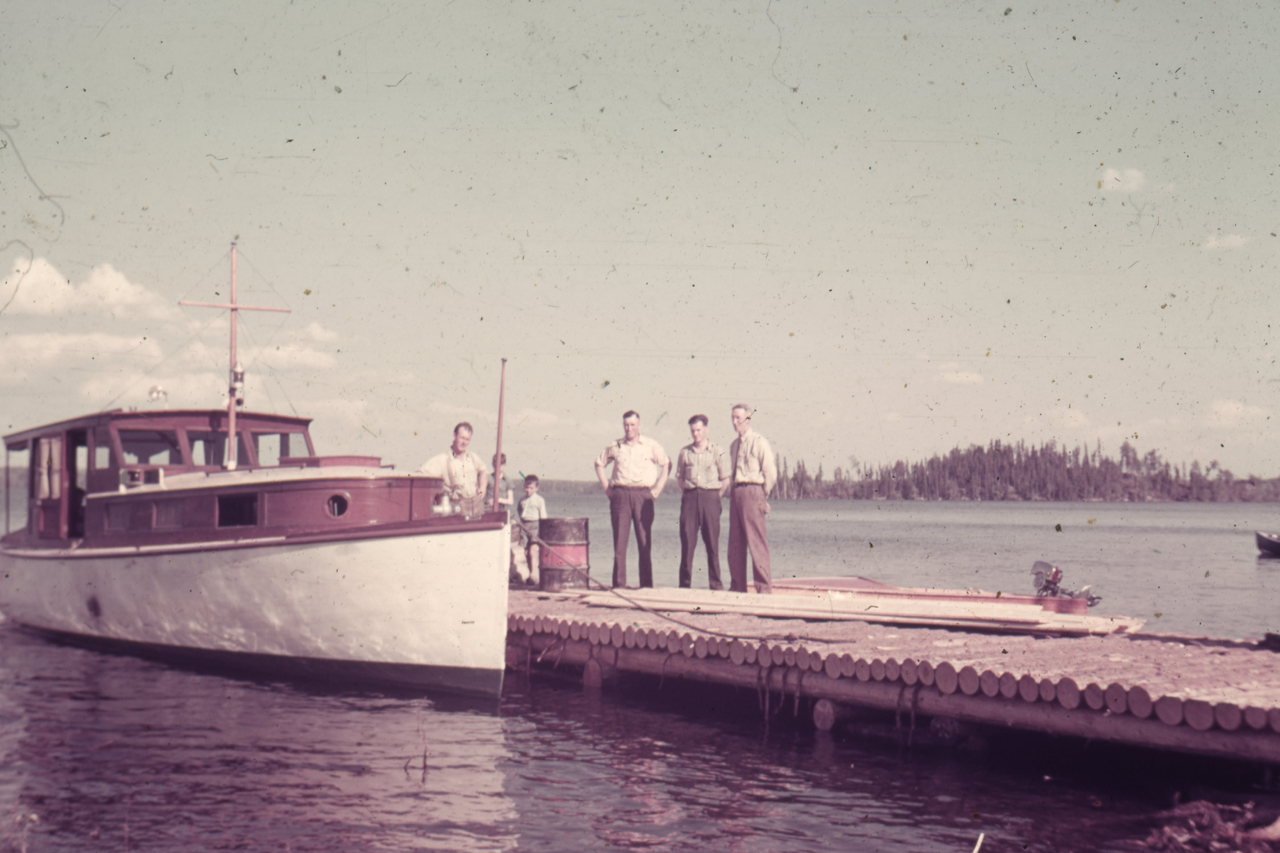
Log Pier Sanshaw Mine 1936

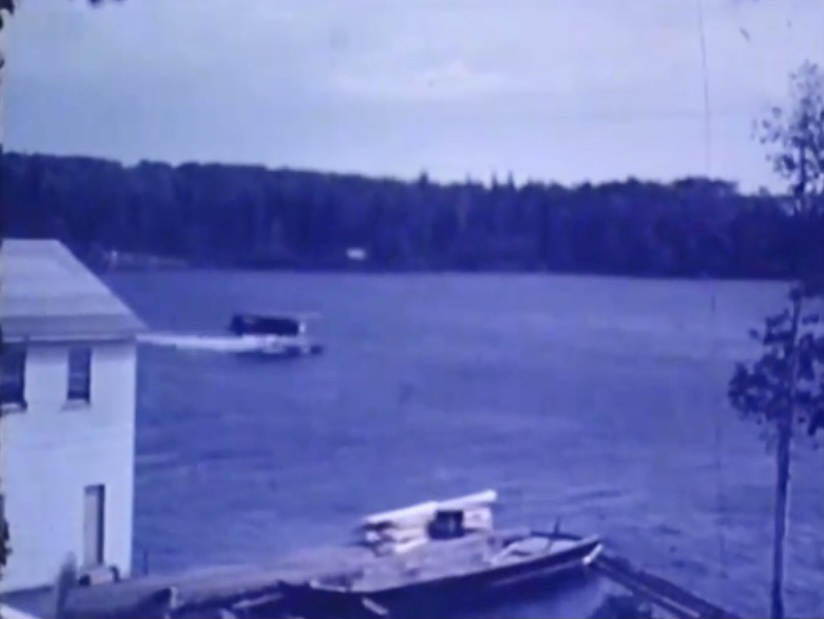
Otter Float Plane Sanshaw Mine 1936

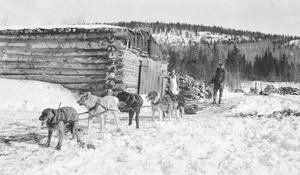
Dog Team in front of Log Structure Sanshaw Mine 1937

== Mine Operations 1937 ==
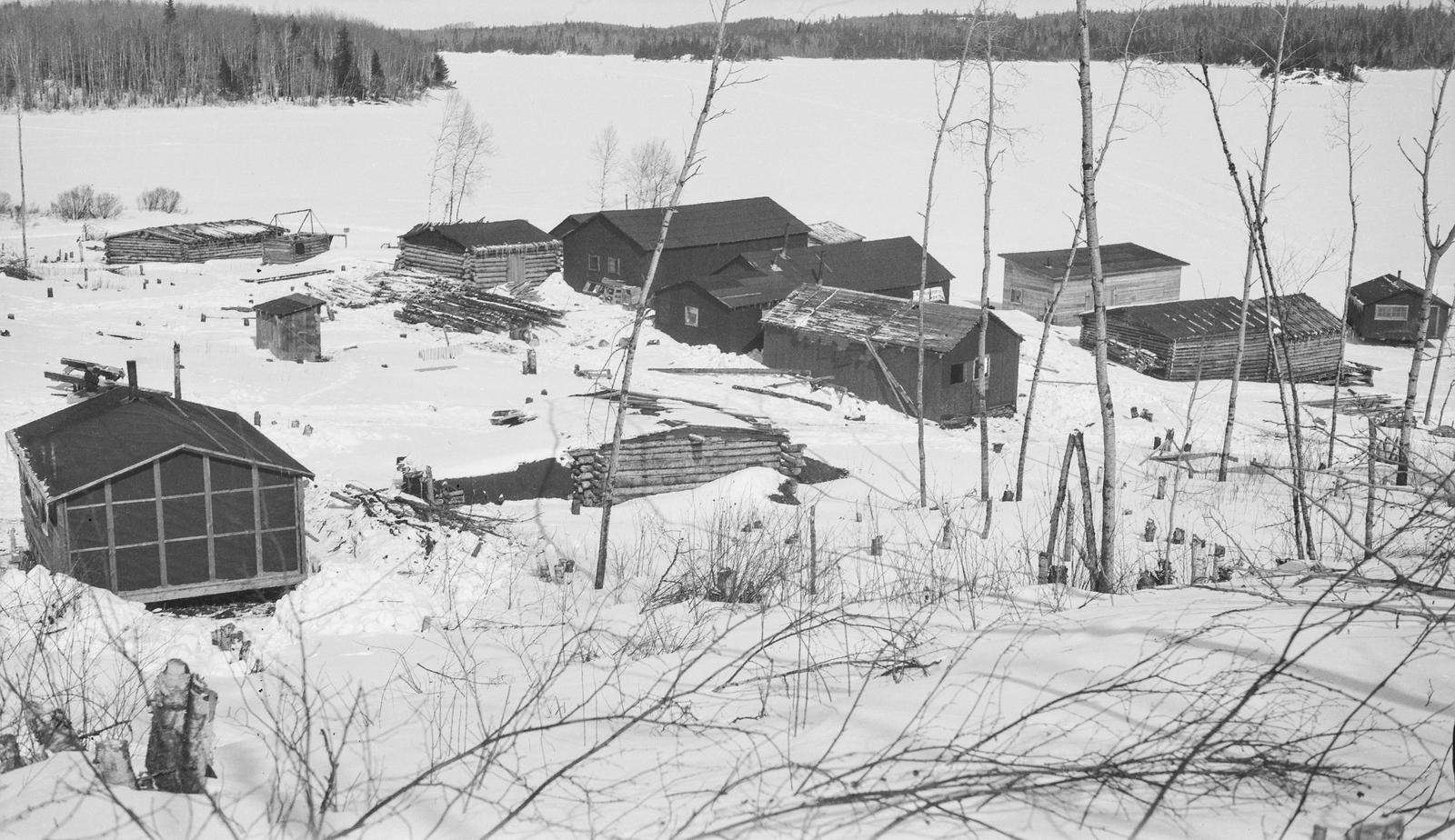
Sanshaw Gold Mine winter 1937

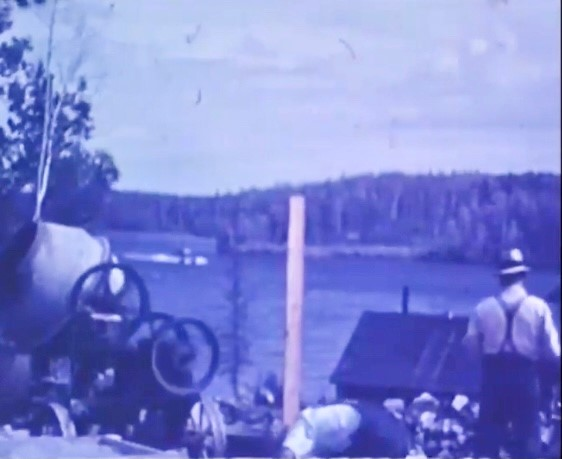
Mixing Cement Sanshaw Gold Mine 1937

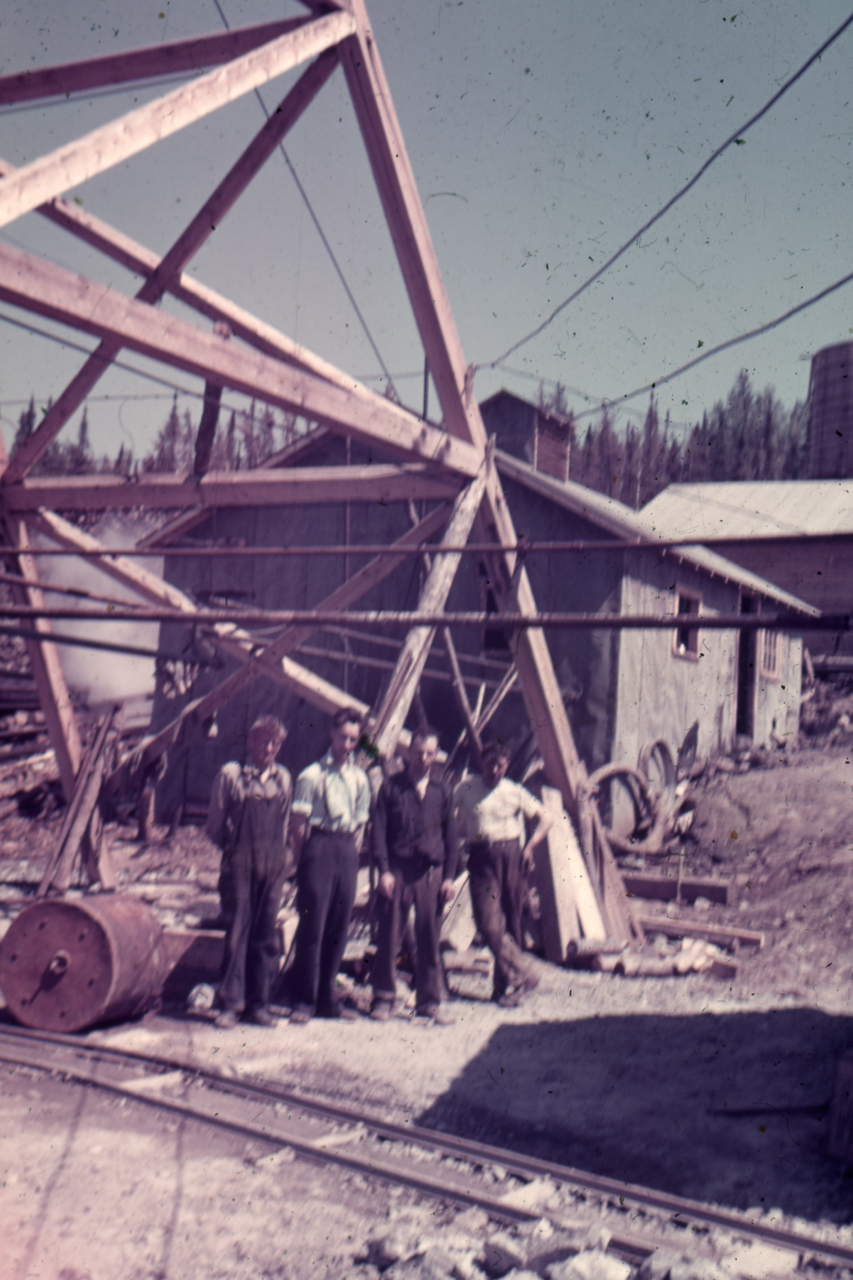
Head frame over Mine Shaft 1937

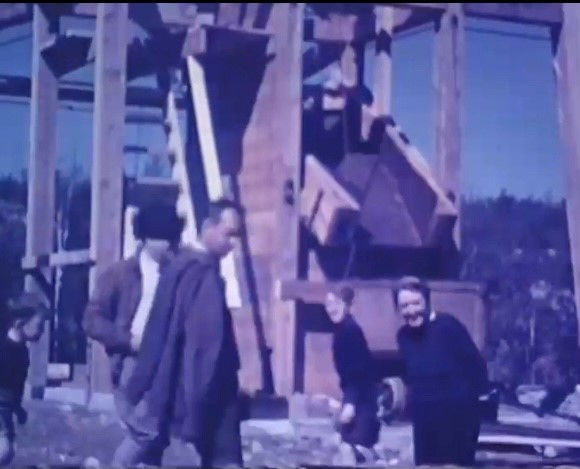
Mine works 1937 Heisey's wife Alice & son Alan Milliken Heisey Sr. to right

Operations ceased in September 1937 and Heisey died shortly thereafter in December of that year at the age of 42.

== Sanshaw Mine After Closure 1938 ==
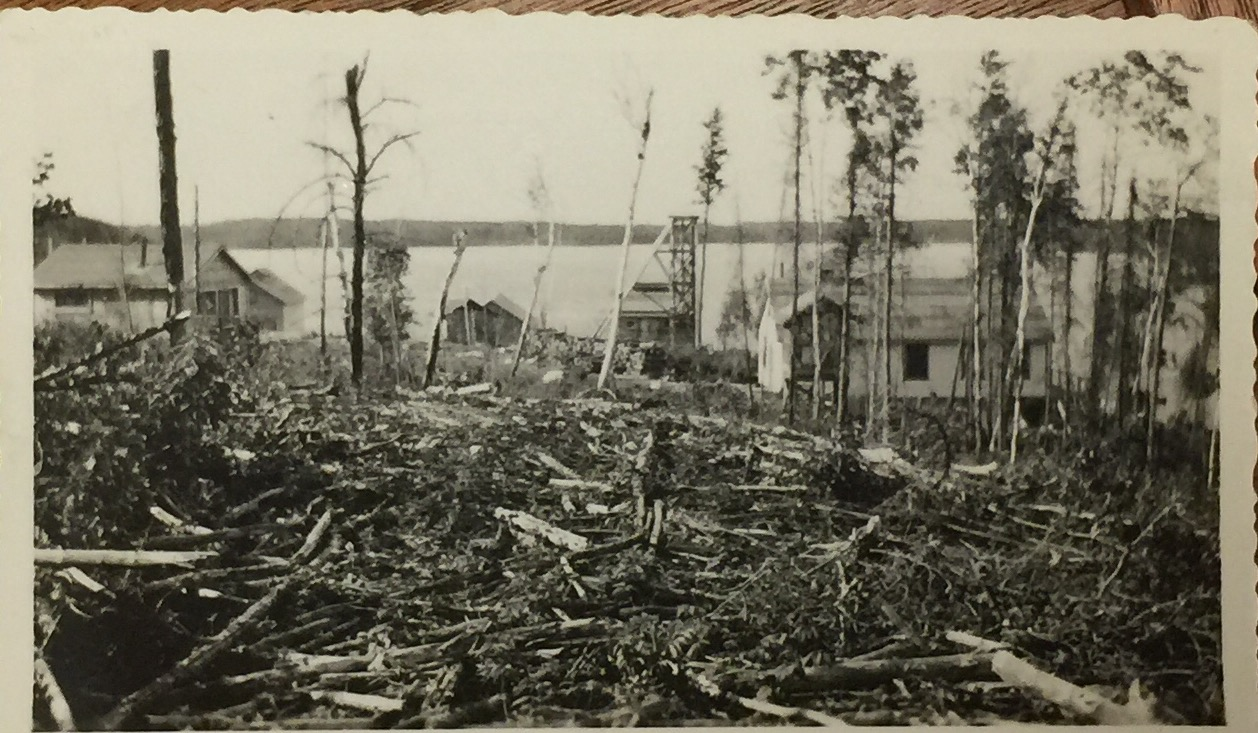
Sanshaw Gold Mine Site 1938 year after closure, Howey Bay background

Stanley Harper with Stag on dog sled, Warehouse, Sanshaw Gold Mine, 1938

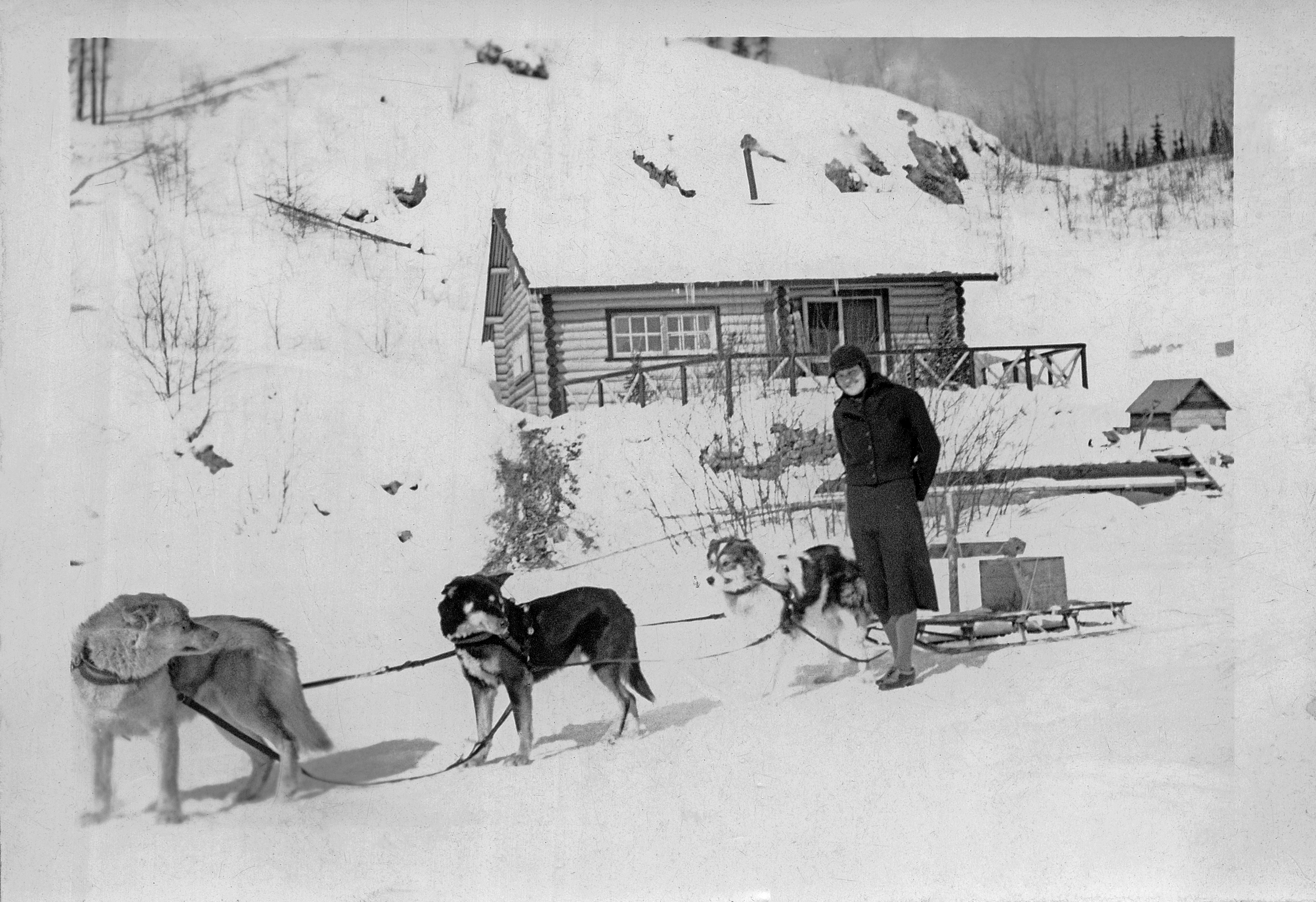
John Gustafson Log Cabin on White Horse Island 1938

== Orlac Gold Mines ==
McKenzie Red Lake Gold Mines optioned the property from 1939–1944, doing 350 metres (1,148 feet) of diamond drilling. Mining at Sanshaw was not restarted until after World War II when it was reopened by Orlac Red Lake Mines, Limited ("Orlac"). During the period 1946–47 Orlac deepened the shaft to 139 metres and established levels at 68 and 106 metres (termed the Orlac deposit). During this period, Orlac drilled 701 metres of underground development, 15 surface holes that totaled 1,655 metres, and 523 metres in 54 underground drill holes. The company changed names twice between 1953 and 1958 but continued to do small amounts of exploration on the property.

In 1948, Cable Mines and Oils Ltd. drilled four surface holes at 1,200 metres, followed by 4,207 metres drilled between 1958 and 1965. At this time, Cable Mines and Oils Ltd. issued a statement that read that, above the 375 ft. level, a resource of 175,000 tons averaging 0.20 ounces of gold per ton had been calculated (historical resource as per Ferguson, S.A. 1966, Geology of Dome Township. District of Kenora; Ontario Department of Mines, Geological Report 45). Following this discovery, Cable Mines Oils Ltd. continued drilling sporadically, testing northern extensions to mineralization.

Bonanza Red Lake Explorations Ltd. moved in 1979 and conducted geophysical surveys, followed by a six hole drill program. The best intersection was reported from hole B79-1, which returned 0.159 ounces per ton over 17.02 feet. This was followed by Pure Gold Resources Inc. who in 1987–88, optioned the property, and conducted exploration on behalf of Noramco Mining Corporation. Diamond drilling of 48 holes totaling 6,637 metres, took place along the east side of Whitehorse Island and on the lake just off the northeast side of the island. In 1988–89 Noramco completed a further 34 holes for a total of 4785 metres in a follow-up program, & outlined a mineralized zone 3 to 5 metres wide, 150 metres long and 125 metres deep. Grades within the zones ranged from up to 2.1 to 12.7 g/T.

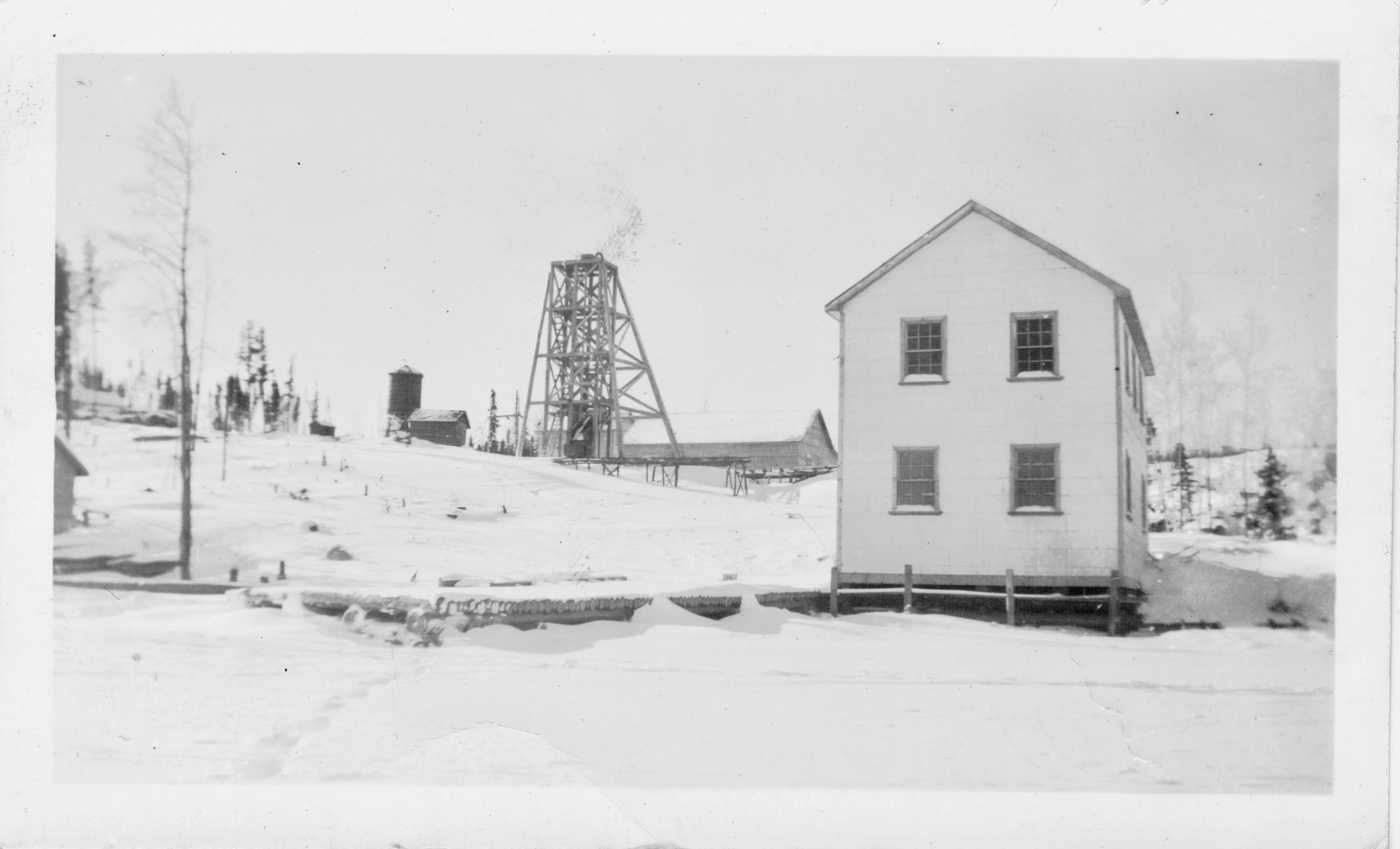
Orlac Gold Mines head shaft and warehouse February 1946

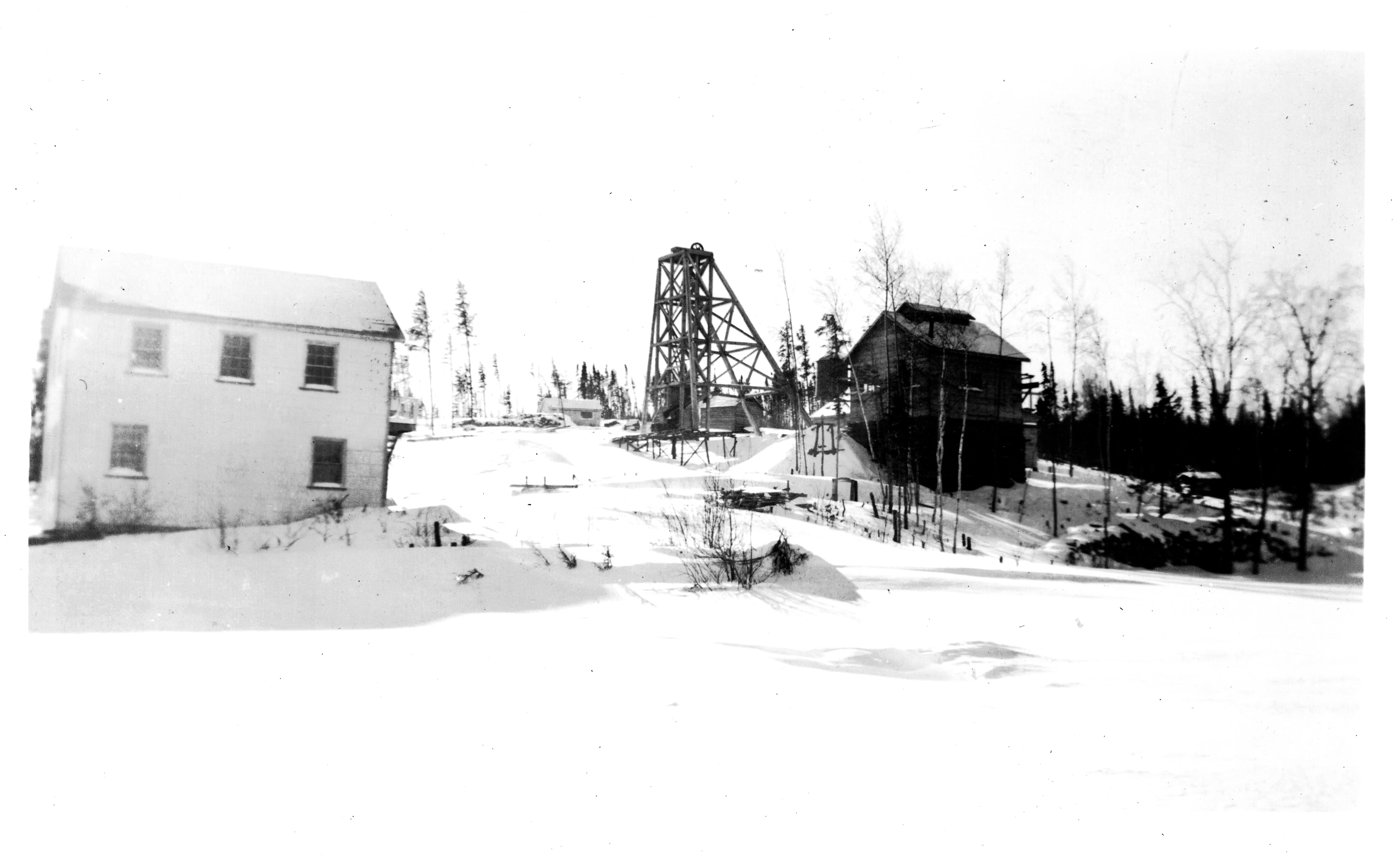
Orlac Gold Mines head shaft, offices and bunkhouse February 1946

== See also ==
- Red Lake, Ontario
- Red Lake Mine
- Karl Brooks Heisey
