= Xiapu dialect =

Dialect of Eastern Min Chinese

Xiapu
- 霞浦話
- Native to: Southern China
- Region: Xiapu, Ningde, Fujian
- Language family: Sino-Tibetan: Sinitic; Chinese; Min; Coastal Min; Eastern Min; Xiapu
- Early forms: Proto-Sino-Tibetan: Old Chinese (Note: Min is believed to have split from Old Chinese, rather than Middle Chinese like other varieties of Chinese.); Proto-Min

Language codes
- ISO 639-3: –
- Glottolog: None
- Linguasphere: 79-AAA-ibe

The Xiapu dialect (Chinese: 霞浦話; pinyin: Xiápǔ huà; Bàng-uâ-cê: Hà-puō-uâ) is a dialect of Eastern Min Chinese spoken in Xiapu, Ningde in northeastern Fujian province of China.

== Phonology ==
The Xiapu dialect has 15 initials, 43 rimes and 7 tones.

=== Initials ===
		Bilabial	Dental	Alveolar	Velar	Glottal
Nasal		m 蒙		n 日	ŋ 語	
Stop	Aspirated	pʰ 波		tʰ 他	kʰ 氣	
Stop	Tenuis	p 邊		t 低	k 求	ʔ 鶯
Fricative		(β)	θ 時	(ʒ)	x 喜	
Affricate	Aspirated			ʦʰ 出		
Affricate	Tenuis			ʦ 曾		
Lateral				l 柳		

=== Rimes ===
a	ia	ua	ai	au	uai
aŋ	iaŋ	uaŋ	aiŋ	ɔuŋ	
aʔ	iaʔ	uaʔ	aiʔ	ɔuʔ	
ɛ, ɔ				ɛu	
ɔʔ					
e, o	ø		oi	eu	
eiŋ, ouŋ	yoŋ				
eiʔ, ouʔ	øʔ, yoʔ				
u	iu		ui		
uŋ	yuŋ				
uʔ	yuʔ				
i, y					
iŋ					
iʔ					

=== Tones ===
No.	1	2	3	4	5	6	7
Tone name	dark level 陰平	light level 陽平	rising 上聲	dark departing 陰去	light departing 陽去	dark entering 陰入	light entering 陽入
Tone contour	˦ (44)	˨ (22)	˦˨ (42)	˧˥ (35)	˨˩˨ (212)	˥ (5)	˨ (2)

=== Initial assimilation ===
The two-syllable initial assimilation rules are shown in the table below:

The Coda of the Former Syllable	The Initial Assimilation of the Latter Syllable
Null coda or /-ʔ/	/p/, /pʰ/ change to /β/; /t/, /tʰ/, /θ/ change to /l/; /x/ change to the null initial; /ʦ/ and /ʦʰ/ change to /ʒ/; /m/, /n/, /ŋ/, /k/, /kʰ/, /l/ and the null initial remain unchanged.
/-ŋ/	/p/ and /pʰ/ change to /m/; /t/, /tʰ/, /θ/ change to /n/; /k/, /kʰ/, /x/ and the null initial change to /ŋ/; /ʦ/ and /ʦʰ/ change to /ʒ/; /m/, /n/ and /ŋ/, /l/ remain unchanged.
/-k̚/	All initials remain unchanged.

=== Tone sandhi ===
The two-syllable tonal sandhi rules are shown in the table below:

		the second syllable						
the first syllable		dark level 44	light level 22	rising 42	dark departing 35	light departing 212	dark entering 5	light entering 2
dark departing 35	55			51				
dark entering 5	55			51				
rising 42	55		51	51				5
dark level 44	44		51					5
light departing 212	44							
light entering 2	44							
light level 22	22							
