= Karl Brooks Heisey =

Canadian mining executive

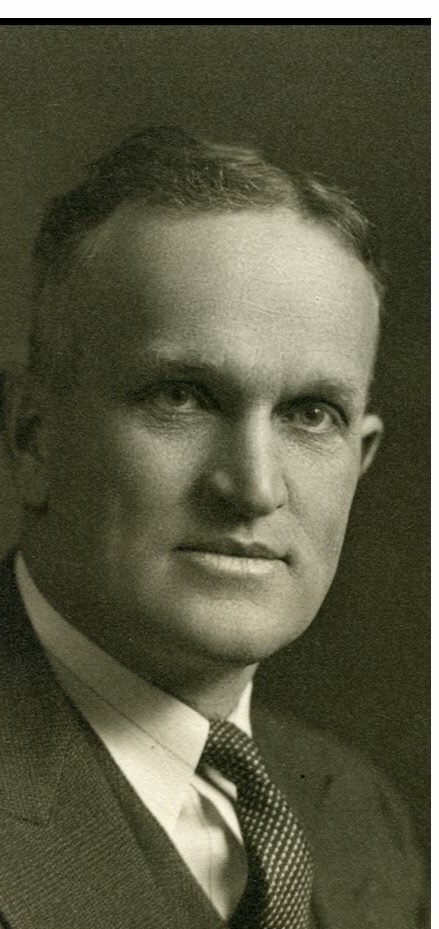
- Karl Heisey ca 1936
- Born: 31 May 1895; Township of Markham, Ontario
- Died: 7 December 1937 (aged 42); City of Toronto, Ontario
- Resting place: Mount Pleasant Cemetery, Toronto
- Occupation: Mining Engineer
- Known for: Discovery and Early Development of Red Lake Mine

Karl Brooks Heisey (31 May 1895, Markham, Ontario – 7 December 1937, Toronto, Ontario) was a Canadian mining engineer and mining executive in the 1930s. Heisey pioneered the exploration and development of the Sanshaw/Red Lake metal deposits located in northwest Ontario. The Red Lake Mine is one of the richest gold mines in the world, still in production today with annual production of 600,000 ounces gold and over 11 million ounces produced to date.

== Early life ==
Heisey was the son of farmers, Jacob Heisey (1856-1933) and Ida Lehman (1871-1941) and was raised in the Township of Markham, York County, Ontario. Heisey family members have farmed in various parts of York Region, including Gormley and Markham Village. The Heisey (originally Heise) family was originally from Lebanon County, Pennsylvania and migrated to Upper Canada in the late 18th or early 19th century.

He enlisted in the Signal Corps of the Canadian Expeditionary Force in 1917, during the First World War. Heisey joined the Royal Flying Corps Canada (the training organisation of the British Royal Flying Corps) as a Cadet, flying out of Camp Borden, Ontario in 1918, and was demobilised at the end of the war as a Royal Air Force Second Lieutenant. He did not see combat and was a flight instructor. Heisey was of Tunker descent (Brethren in Christ Church) a pacifist German sect of Anabaptism.

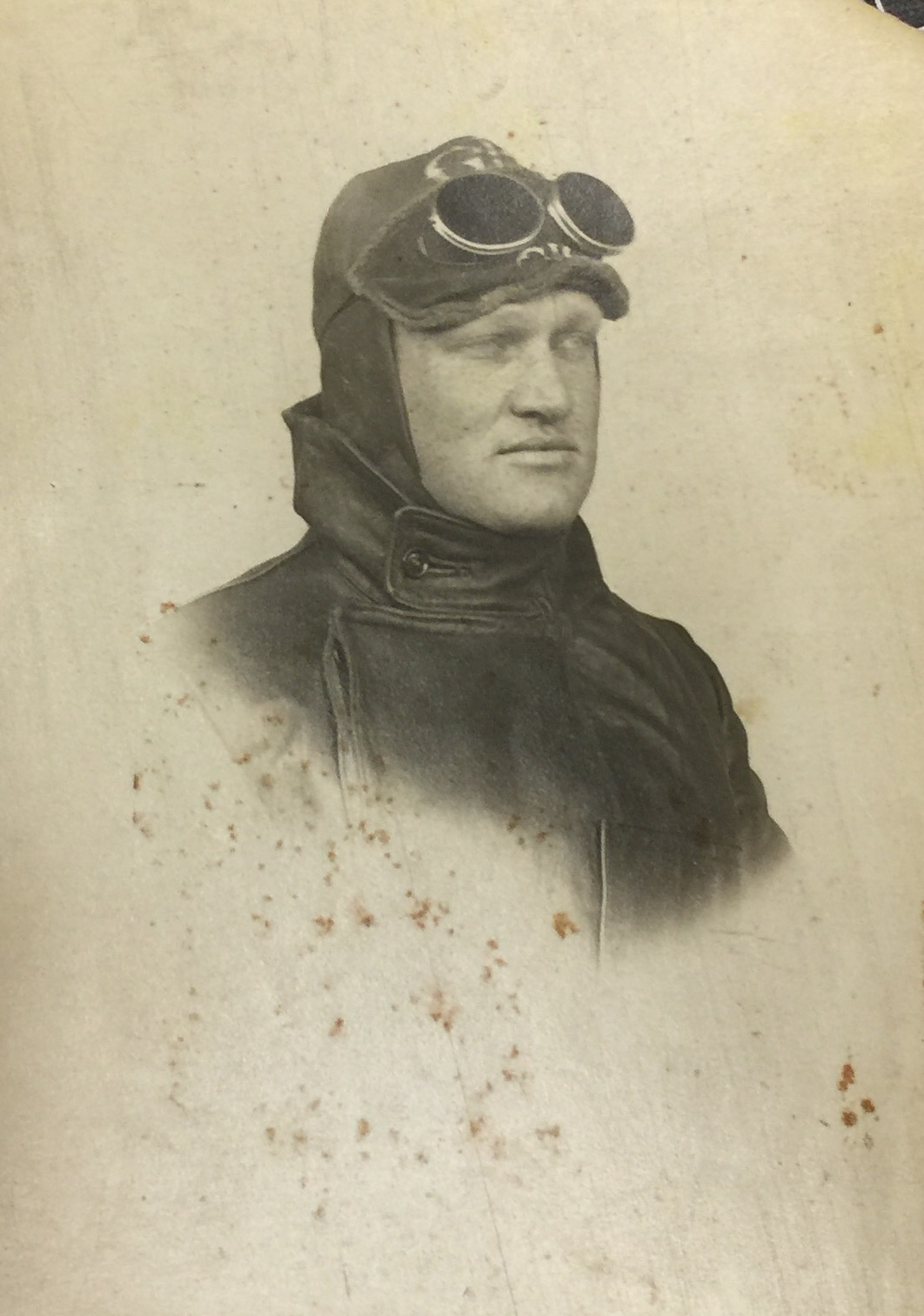
RAF 2nd Lt. Karl Heisey c.1920

Heisey obtained a bachelor's degree in Applied Science from the College of Applied Science (Mining) at the University of Toronto in 1922. He was married to Alice Isabel Smith (1895–1968) in 1927. He had 3 sons Alan Milliken Heisey Sr., Lawrence Heisey and Karl Brooks Heisey Jr.

== Mining career ==
As both a highly experienced pilot and mining engineer Heisey was well positioned to participate in the Red Lake and Kirkland Lake Gold Rushes in northern Ontario in the 1930s. Red Lake was inaccessible by road until 1947 when Ontario Highway 105 was constructed and the only access prior to then was by boat or plane. Kirkland Lake had no road access until 1937.

Heisey engaged in geological surveys for the Ontario Ministry of Natural Resources between 1919 and 1922 in Kirkland Lake and West Shinintree and conducted magnetic surveys for discovery of gold with pyrrhotite iron.

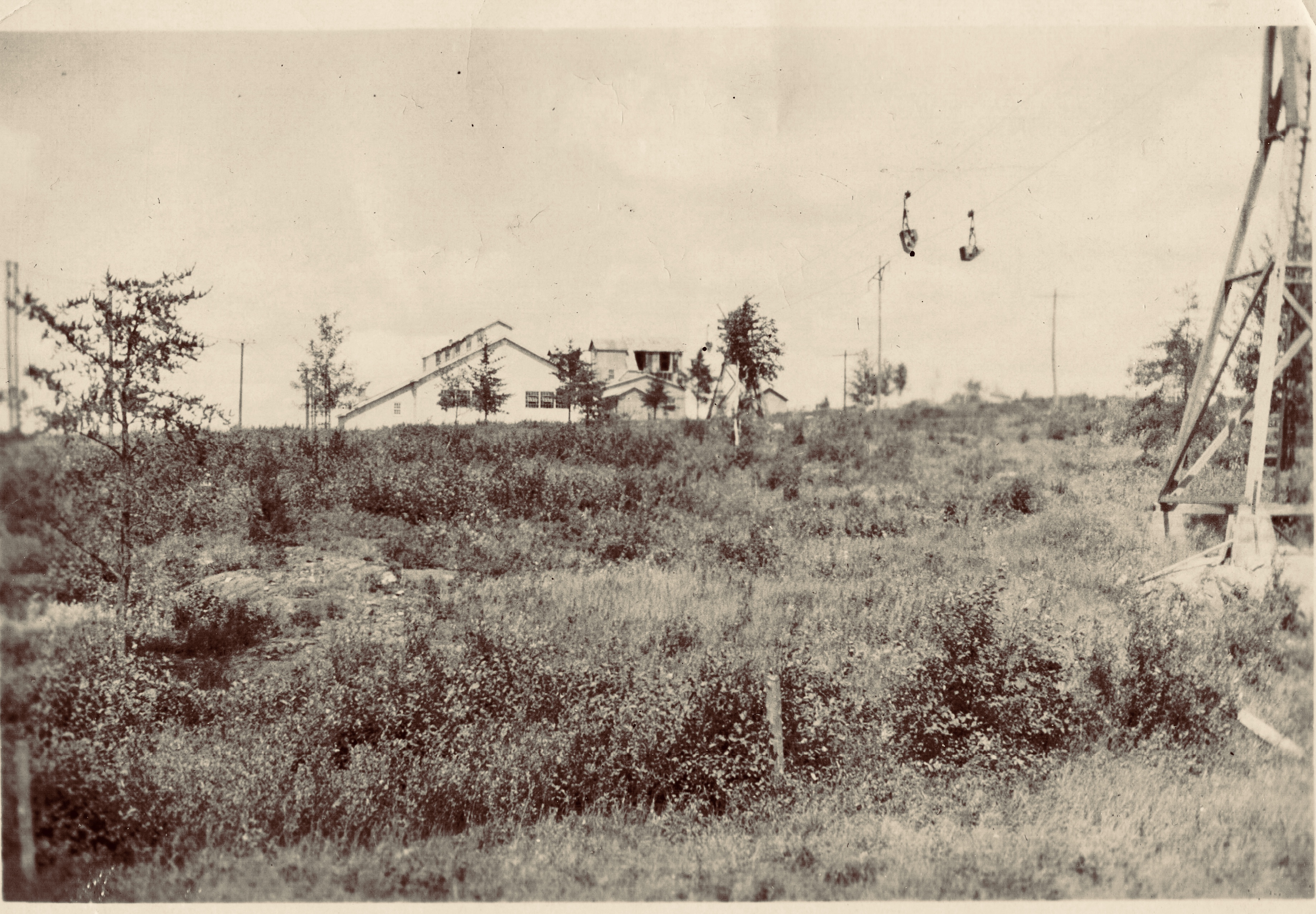
Tough-Oakes Burnside Mine 1931

Following this, Heisey worked as an engineer with Argonaut Mines, Kirkland Lake from 1922 to 1923. In 1924 he was appointed chief engineer of Tough Oakes Gold Mines and the same year he joined the Mond Nickel Company as exploration engineer in the Quebec field. Heisey opened his own office in Kirkland Lake in 1928, coming to Toronto in 1930.

Heisey was affiliated with numerous other mining corporations throughout his career where he held various roles, some of these corporations include: Manitoba and Eastern Mines Ltd., Marquette Long Lac, and Russet Red Lake Syndicate. His appointments with these mines included being in charge of surface work, consulting and direction of a new extensive diamond-drilling program, as well as consulting and analysis leading to recommendation of diamond drilling of a section of the property respectively. Heisey also has authorship on an assessment report on Ossian Mines Ltd. for the Ministry of Northern Development and Mines of Ontario; his assessment outlined analysis of the mine as well as recommendations for future work.

== Sanshaw Gold Mine ==
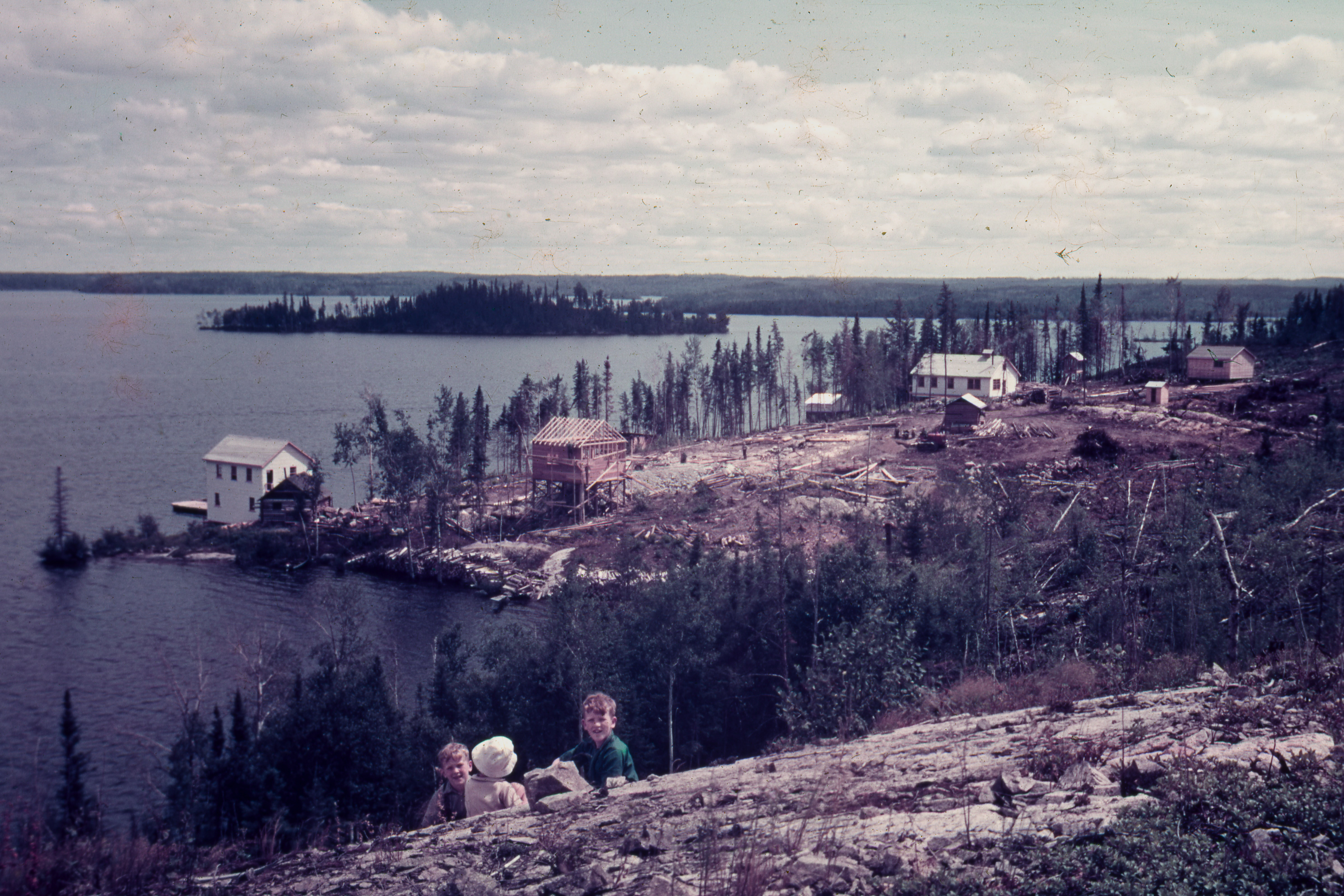
Sanshaw Mine, White Horse Island, Red Lake overlooking Hammell Channel. Heisey's children in foreground Lawrence Heisey, Karl Jr. wearing hat and Alan Milliken Heisey Sr.

Heisey was President of Sanshaw Mines, Limited, incorporated in 1936, which owned claims on White Horse Island, on Red Lake which was first staked by the Sanshaw Mines Syndicate. 15 diamond drill holes were drilled totalling 1160 m in 1936. He was the manager and driving force of the Sanshaw Gold Mine which was developed on White Horse Island during 1936–7. Heisey's crew uncovered a previously unknown well-mineralized shear and gold vein in 1936 which was the most important discovered up until that time in the Red Lake area.

Operations ceased in September 1937 and Heisey died shortly thereafter in December of that year at the age of 42. Heisey is buried at Mount Pleasant Cemetery, Toronto in a family plot. His parents are buried in Quantztown Cemetery in Markham, Ontario and earlier members of the Heise family are buried in Heise Hill Cemetery in northwest Markham.

== Gallery ==
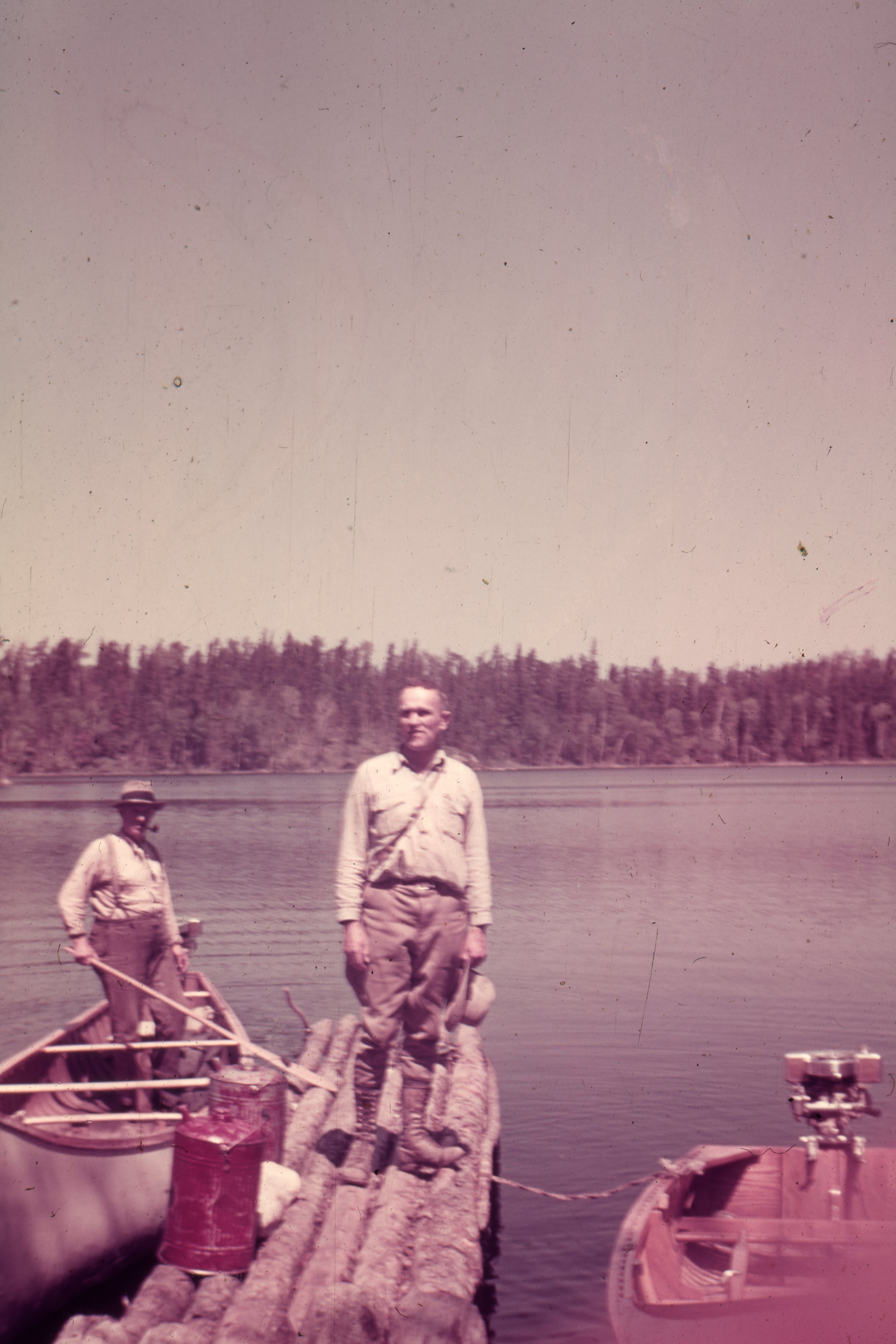
Karl Heisey freight canoe 1935

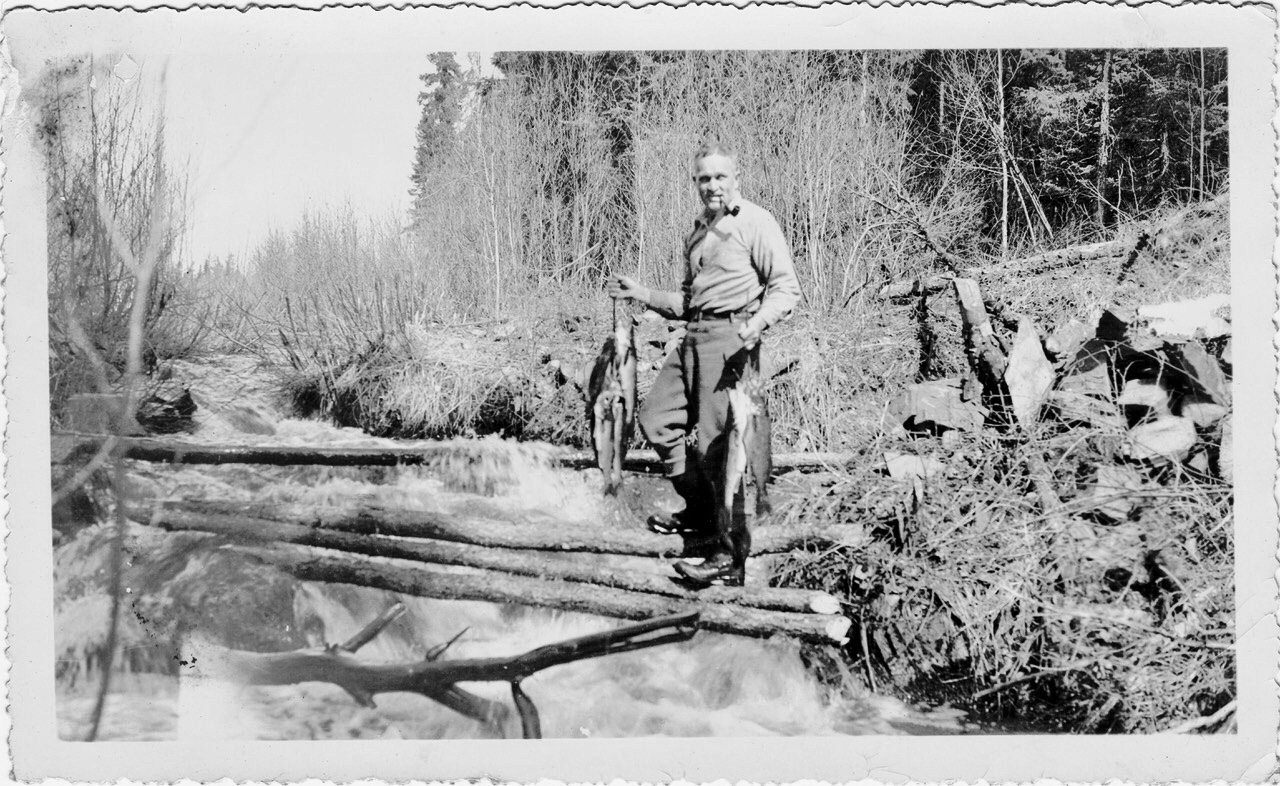
Heisey fishing in stream in Red Lake area 1936

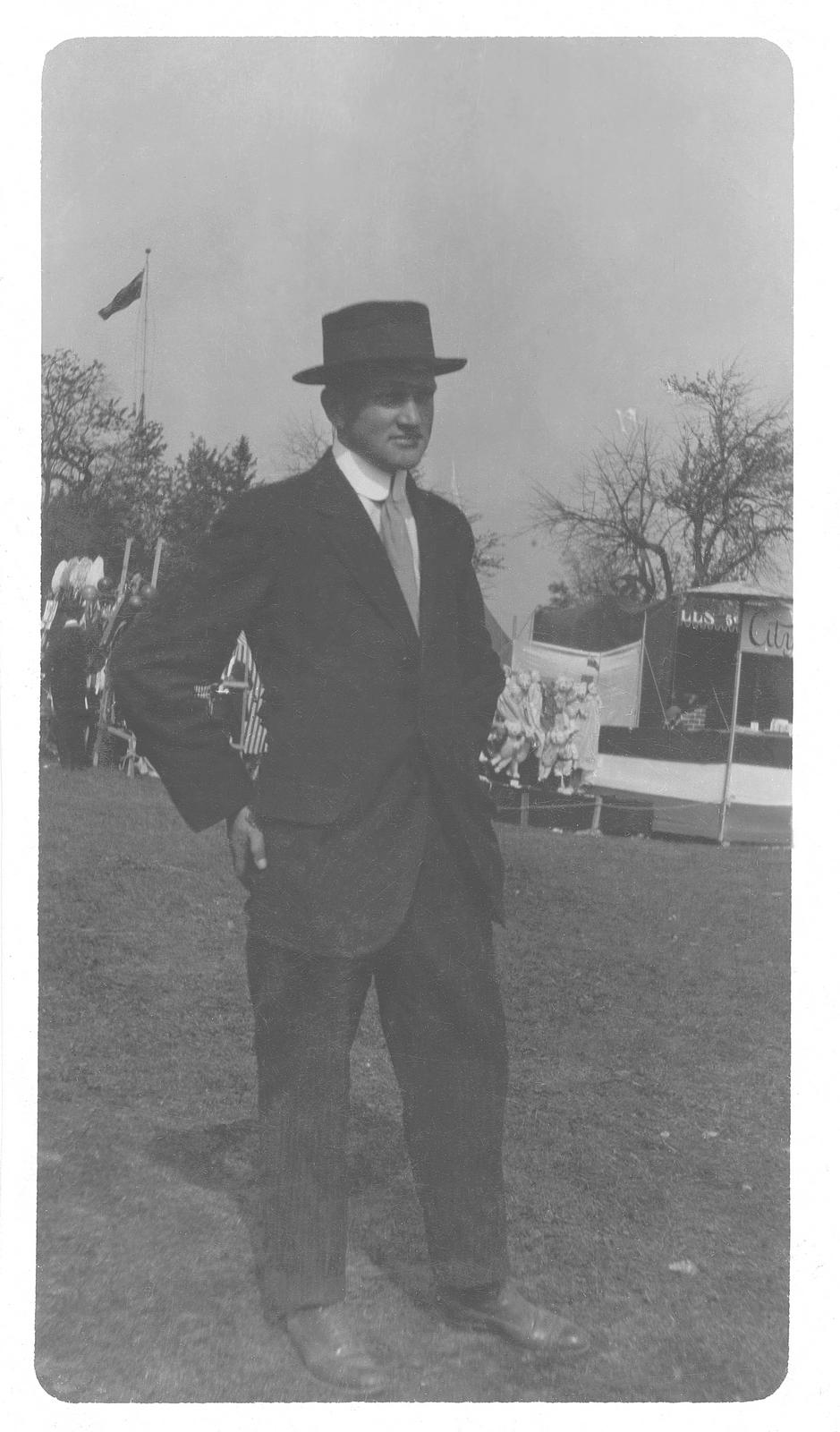
Karl Heisey at Markham Fair in 1920’s

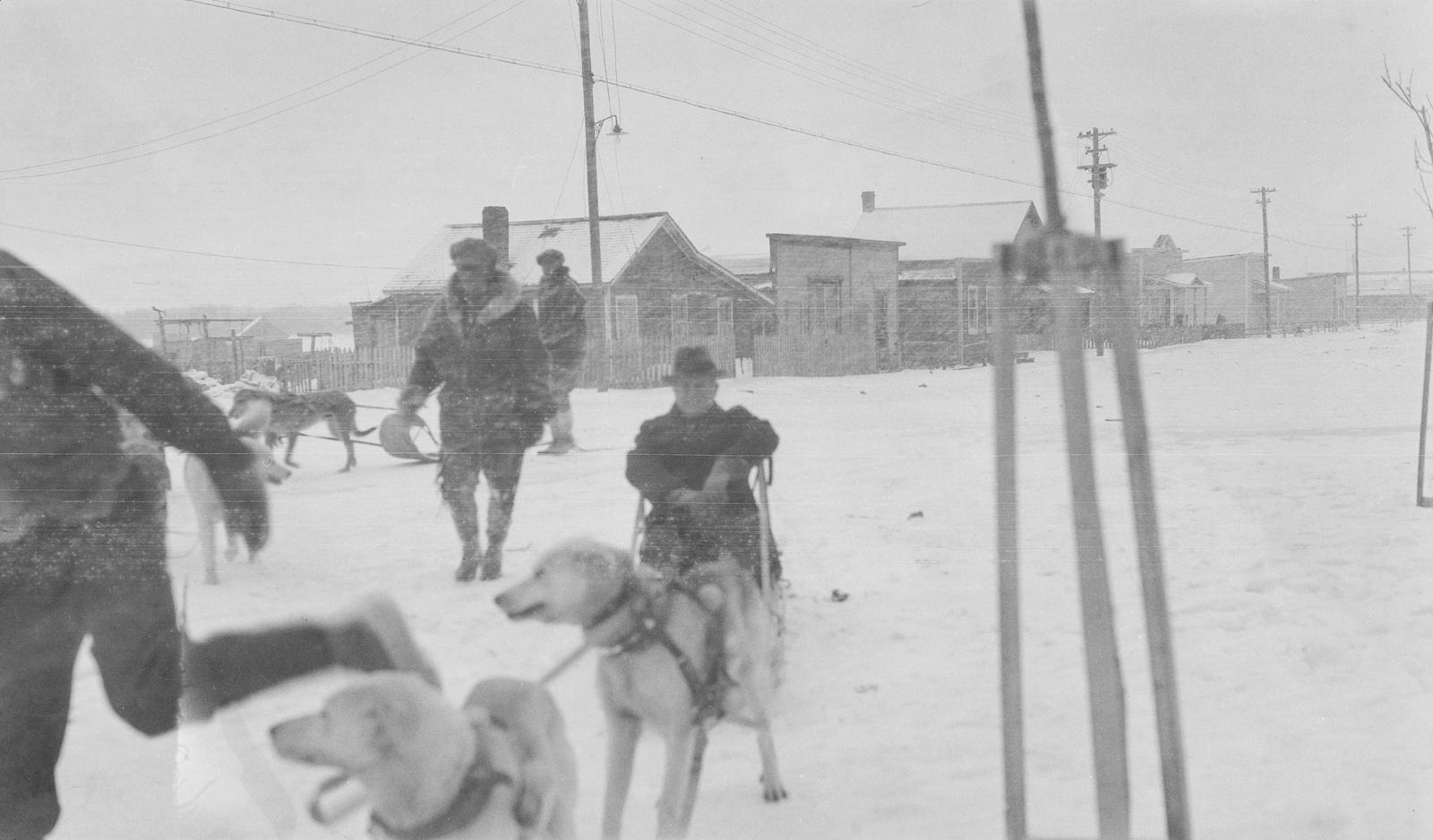
Karl Heisey on dog sled Red Lake 1936

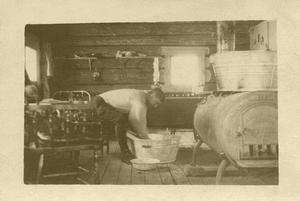
Karl Heisey winter 1937 washing clothes
