= Xiapu =

Xiapu County 霞浦县 Siapu
- County
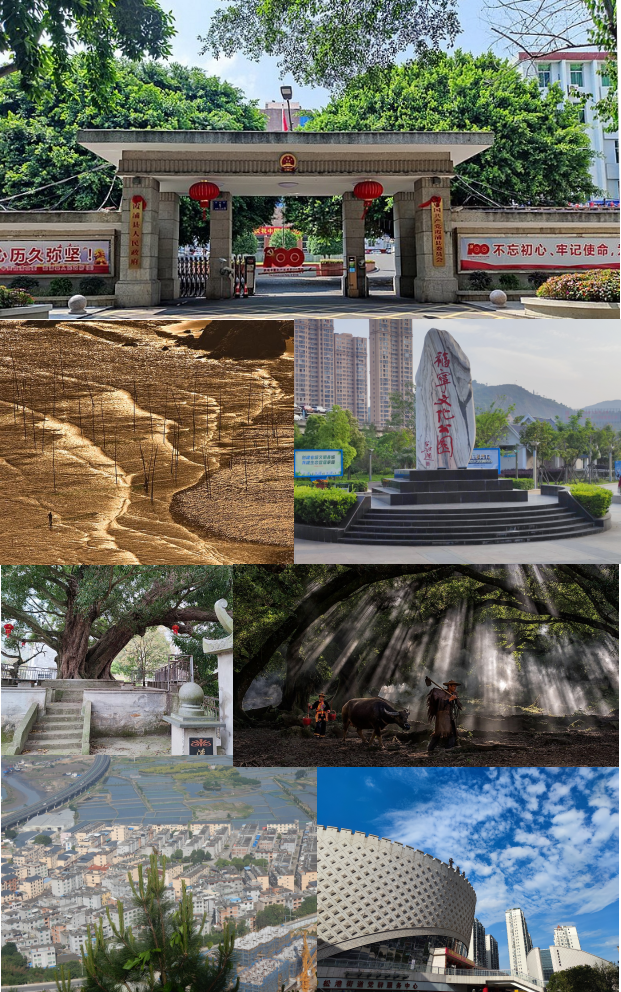
- People's government of Xiapu County, Xiaohao Mudflat in Sansha Town, view of Guxian village (古县村), Chinese burbur on a Pinus massoniana, Xiapu Museum, view of Yangjiaxi Scenic Area, Funing Cultural Park (counterclockwise order)

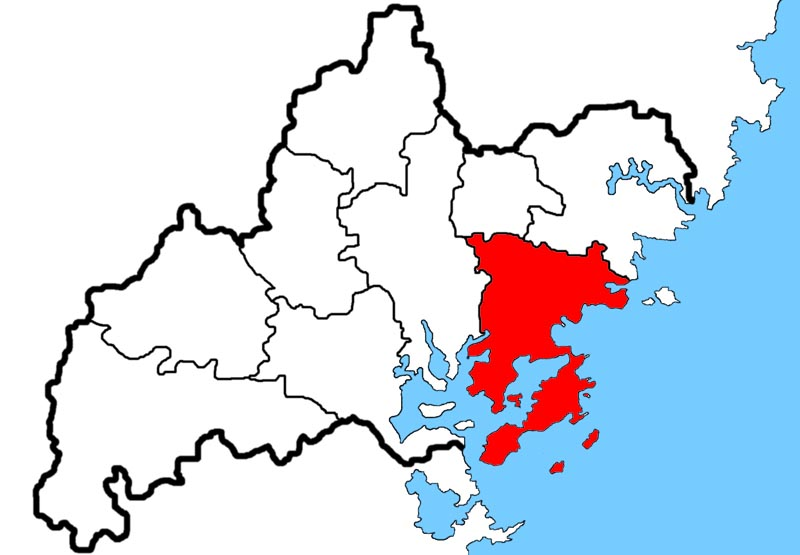
- Xiapu in Ningde

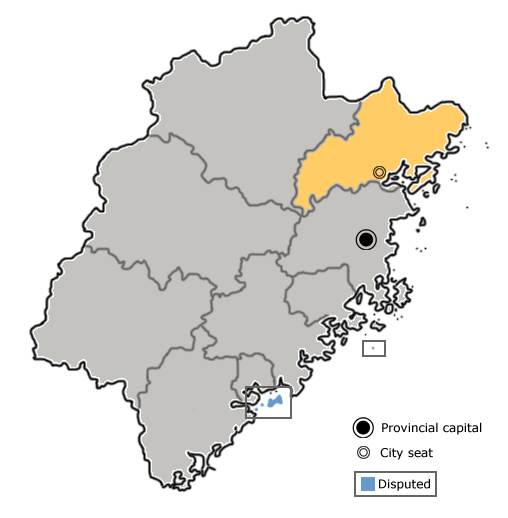
- Ningde in Fujian
- Coordinates: 26°57′37″N 119°58′28″E
- Country: People's Republic of China
- Province: Fujian
- Prefecture-level city: Ningde

Area
  - Total: 1,716 km^{2} (663 sq mi)

Population (2020)
  - Total: 475,936
  - Density: 277.4/km^{2} (718.3/sq mi)
- Time zone: UTC+8 (China Standard)
- Postal code: 355100
- Website: xiapu.gov.cn (in Chinese)

Xiapu (Chinese: 霞浦; pinyin: Xiápǔ; Foochow Romanized: Hà-puō) is a county in the municipal region of Ningde, Fujian, People's Republic of China, located along a stretch of East China Sea coast, with many harbours and islands. It is bordered by Fuding City and Zherong County to the north, Fu'an City and Ningde's urban area to the west, and Luoyuan County, Fuzhou and the Matsu Islands of Lienchiang County, Republic of China (Taiwan) to the south.

Xiapu is famous among lovers of landscape photography.

== Administration ==
The county executive, legislature and judiciary are in Songcheng Subdistrict (松城街道), together with the CPC branch. The county court and PSB branch are in Songgang Subdistrict (松港街道), the county hospital and industrial district are in Songshan Subdistrict (松山街道).

Xiapu has jurisdiction over 6 towns (镇; zhèn) and over 6 townships (乡; xiāng), of which three are ethnic townships designated for the native She people. Zhouyang Township (州洋乡) was once a township under the jurisdiction of Xiapu and was abolished in 2003.

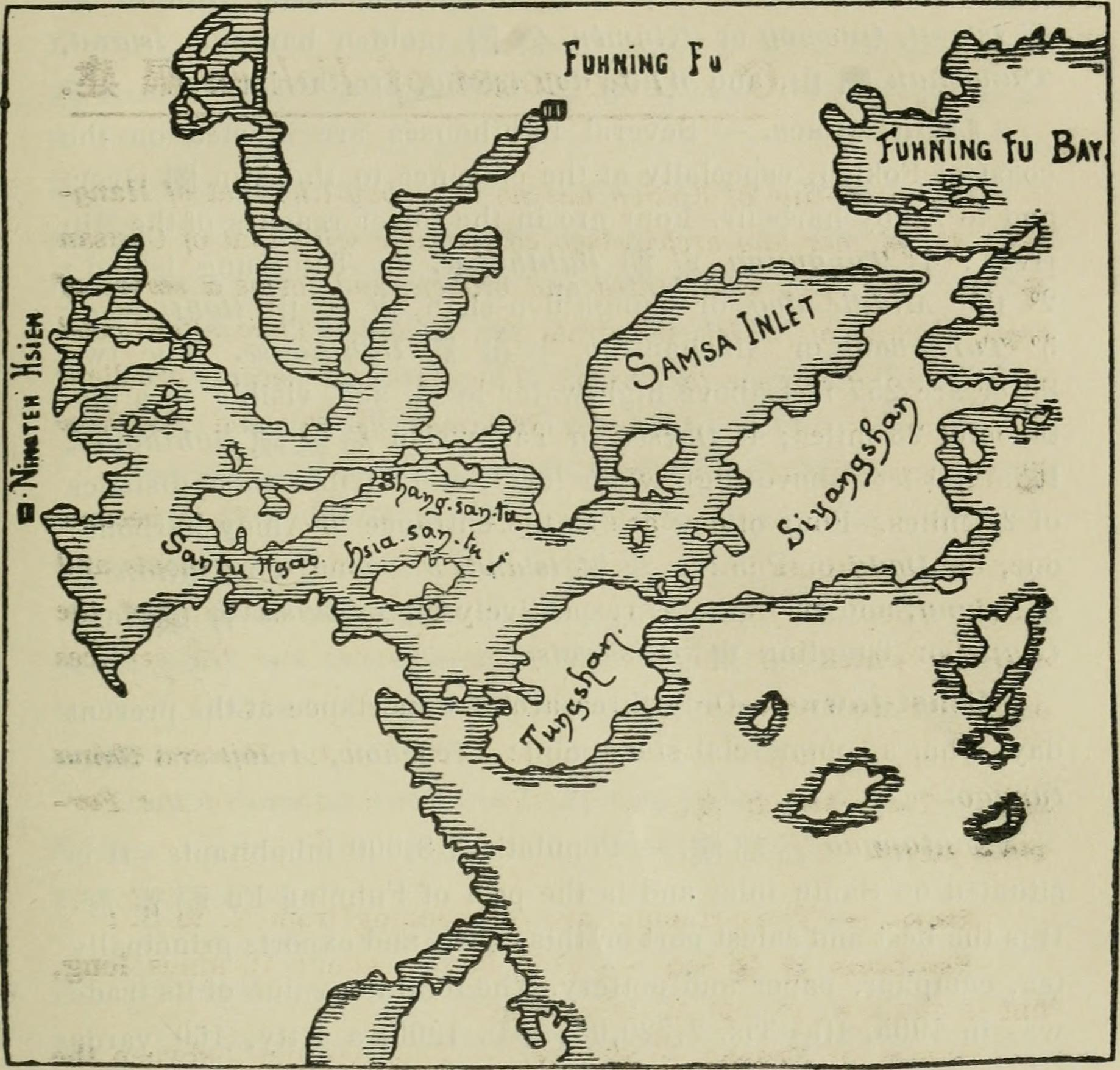
Xiapu County area (1908)

=== Towns ===
- Sansha (三沙镇)
- Yacheng (牙城镇)
- Xi'nan (溪南镇)
- Shajiang (沙江镇)
- Xiahu (下浒镇)
- Changchun (长春镇)

=== Townships ===
- Baiyang (柏洋乡)
- Beibi (北壁乡)
- Haidao (海岛乡)
- Yantian She Ethnic Township (盐田畲族乡)
- Shuimen She Ethnic Township (水门畲族乡)
- Chongru She Ethnic Township (崇儒畲族乡)

== Scenic Areas ==
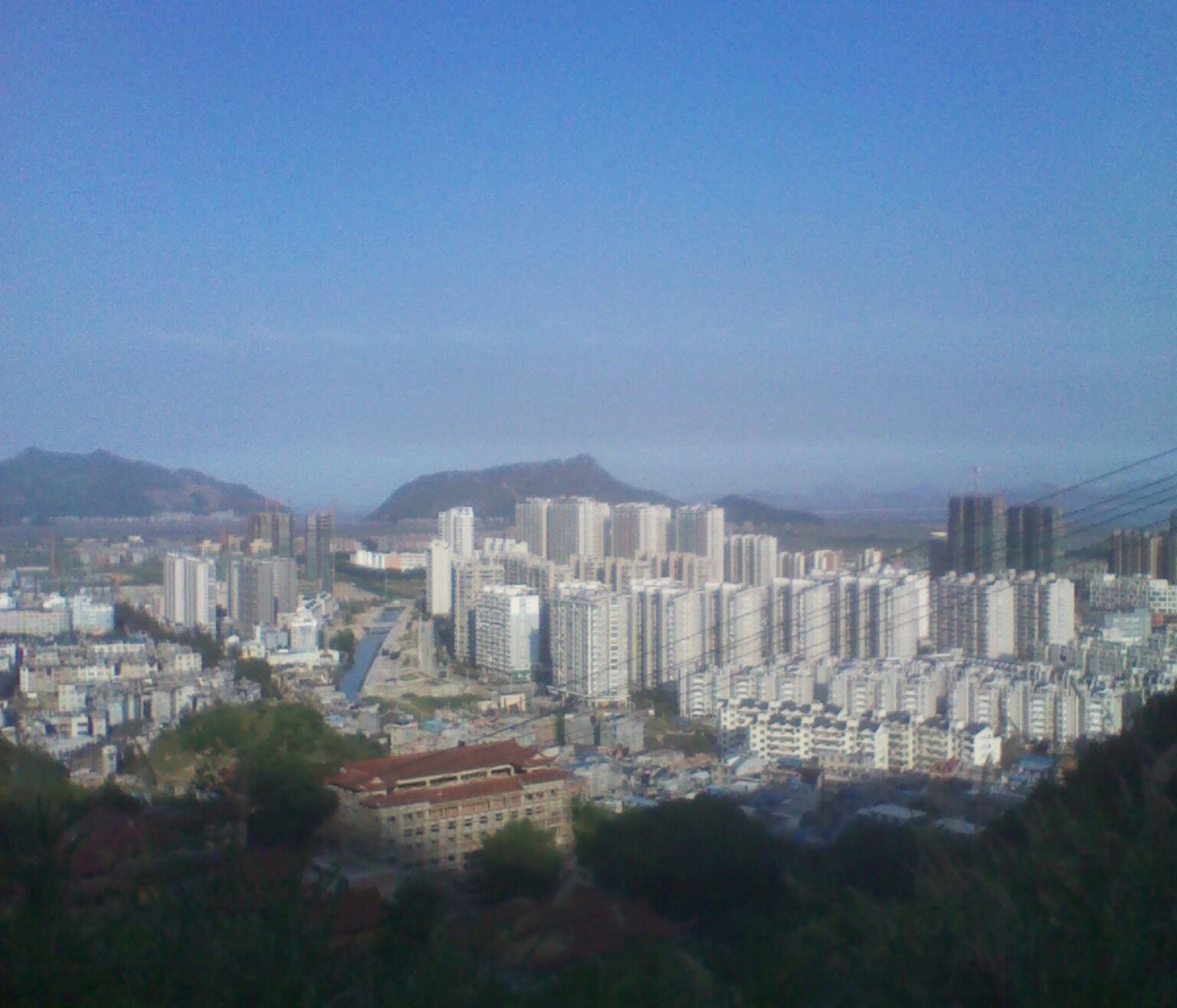
Xiapu county seat

- Dongchong Peninsula (东冲半岛, includes Changchun Town, Xiahu Town and Beibi Township)
- Guanyin Tingzhai (观音亭寨, means the castle of Guanyin pavilion, located in Shuimen She Ethnic Township)
- Yangjiaxi Scenic Area (杨家溪风景区, located in Yacheng Town)

== Transportation ==
- Xiapu Railway Station on the Wenzhou-Fuzhou Railway

== Xiapu Manichaean manuscripts ==
In 2008, the Xiapu Manichaean manuscripts of Shangwan Village 上万村, in Baiyang Township, Xiapu County became publicly known to the scientific world. They are manuscripts from a religion known as Manichaeism, which now only exists as Chinese Manichaeism. They continue to be used by a local priest, Chen Peisheng 陈培生, in his Manichaean rituals.

== Xiapu in the News ==
On August 9, 2009, Xiapu was where Typhoon Morakot made continental landfall. A million people had just been evacuated from vulnerable areas of this and surrounding counties.

== Climate ==
Climate data for Xiapu, elevation 57 m (187 ft), (1991–2020 normals, extremes 1962–present)
Month	Jan	Feb	Mar	Apr	May	Jun	Jul	Aug	Sep	Oct	Nov	Dec	Year
Record high °C (°F)	26.2 (79.2)	26.7 (80.1)	31.6 (88.9)	33.1 (91.6)	35.6 (96.1)	38.4 (101.1)	40.1 (104.2)	38.6 (101.5)	37.5 (99.5)	34.4 (93.9)	30.8 (87.4)	28.0 (82.4)	40.1 (104.2)
Mean daily maximum °C (°F)	13.3 (55.9)	13.7 (56.7)	16.1 (61.0)	20.8 (69.4)	25.3 (77.5)	29.1 (84.4)	32.3 (90.1)	32.0 (89.6)	29.4 (84.9)	25.4 (77.7)	21.1 (70.0)	16.0 (60.8)	22.9 (73.2)
Daily mean °C (°F)	9.9 (49.8)	10.3 (50.5)	12.6 (54.7)	17.1 (62.8)	21.8 (71.2)	25.7 (78.3)	28.7 (83.7)	28.4 (83.1)	26.0 (78.8)	21.7 (71.1)	17.4 (63.3)	12.3 (54.1)	19.3 (66.8)
Mean daily minimum °C (°F)	7.5 (45.5)	7.9 (46.2)	10.2 (50.4)	14.4 (57.9)	19.1 (66.4)	22.9 (73.2)	25.6 (78.1)	25.5 (77.9)	23.1 (73.6)	18.7 (65.7)	14.6 (58.3)	9.5 (49.1)	16.6 (61.9)
Record low °C (°F)	−3.4 (25.9)	−1.4 (29.5)	0.2 (32.4)	5.5 (41.9)	9.9 (49.8)	15.1 (59.2)	20.2 (68.4)	21.7 (71.1)	15.5 (59.9)	7.8 (46.0)	3.5 (38.3)	−2.7 (27.1)	−3.4 (25.9)
Average precipitation mm (inches)	56.7 (2.23)	76.7 (3.02)	131.4 (5.17)	118.6 (4.67)	157.2 (6.19)	241.0 (9.49)	135.3 (5.33)	210.1 (8.27)	111.3 (4.38)	48.9 (1.93)	60.6 (2.39)	47.5 (1.87)	1,395.3 (54.94)
Average precipitation days (≥ 0.1 mm)	10.8	12.9	17.3	15.8	16.3	16.0	10.3	13.1	11.1	6.6	8.8	9.4	148.4
Average snowy days	0.3	0.4	0.1	0	0	0	0	0	0	0	0	0.1	0.9
Average relative humidity (%)	76	79	81	81	81	84	79	79	76	71	73	72	78
Mean monthly sunshine hours	90.9	83.2	95.5	112.6	125.7	134.1	232.0	210.3	166.1	159.4	108.8	109.3	1,627.9
Percentage possible sunshine	28	26	26	29	30	33	55	52	45	45	34	34	36
Source: China Meteorological Administrationall-time low

Climate data for Sansha Town, Xiapu, elevation 92 m (302 ft), (1991−2020 normals)
Month	Jan	Feb	Mar	Apr	May	Jun	Jul	Aug	Sep	Oct	Nov	Dec	Year
Mean daily maximum °C (°F)	12.2 (54.0)	12.5 (54.5)	15.2 (59.4)	19.6 (67.3)	23.9 (75.0)	27.3 (81.1)	30.2 (86.4)	30.8 (87.4)	28.4 (83.1)	24.2 (75.6)	19.8 (67.6)	14.9 (58.8)	21.6 (70.9)
Daily mean °C (°F)	9.8 (49.6)	9.8 (49.6)	12.2 (54.0)	16.6 (61.9)	21.2 (70.2)	24.7 (76.5)	27.5 (81.5)	28.1 (82.6)	26.1 (79.0)	21.9 (71.4)	17.6 (63.7)	12.3 (54.1)	19.0 (66.2)
Mean daily minimum °C (°F)	7.9 (46.2)	7.9 (46.2)	10.2 (50.4)	14.5 (58.1)	19.3 (66.7)	22.8 (73.0)	25.6 (78.1)	26.1 (79.0)	24.2 (75.6)	20.1 (68.2)	15.8 (60.4)	10.3 (50.5)	17.1 (62.7)
Average precipitation mm (inches)	58.3 (2.30)	66.6 (2.62)	127.0 (5.00)	118.7 (4.67)	131.9 (5.19)	212.0 (8.35)	96.6 (3.80)	166.0 (6.54)	144.9 (5.70)	42.7 (1.68)	79.4 (3.13)	48.4 (1.91)	1,292.5 (50.89)
Average precipitation days (≥ 0.1 mm)	10.0	12.6	15.8	15.3	16.2	16.2	9.5	12.6	12.9	8.4	10.1	8.8	148.4
Average snowy days	0.1	0	0	0	0	0	0	0	0	0	0	0.4	0.5
Average relative humidity (%)	73	77	79	80	83	87	85	82	76	70	72	68	78
Mean monthly sunshine hours	92.7	82.2	108.9	119.2	125.8	127.6	233.7	230.0	180.9	170.8	103.3	115.3	1,690.4
Percentage possible sunshine	28	26	29	31	30	31	56	57	49	48	32	36	38
Source: China Meteorological Administration

== See also ==
- Xiapu dialect
