= Chongru She Ethnic Township =

Town in Fujian, China

Chongru 崇儒畲族乡 Ch'ung-ju
- Town
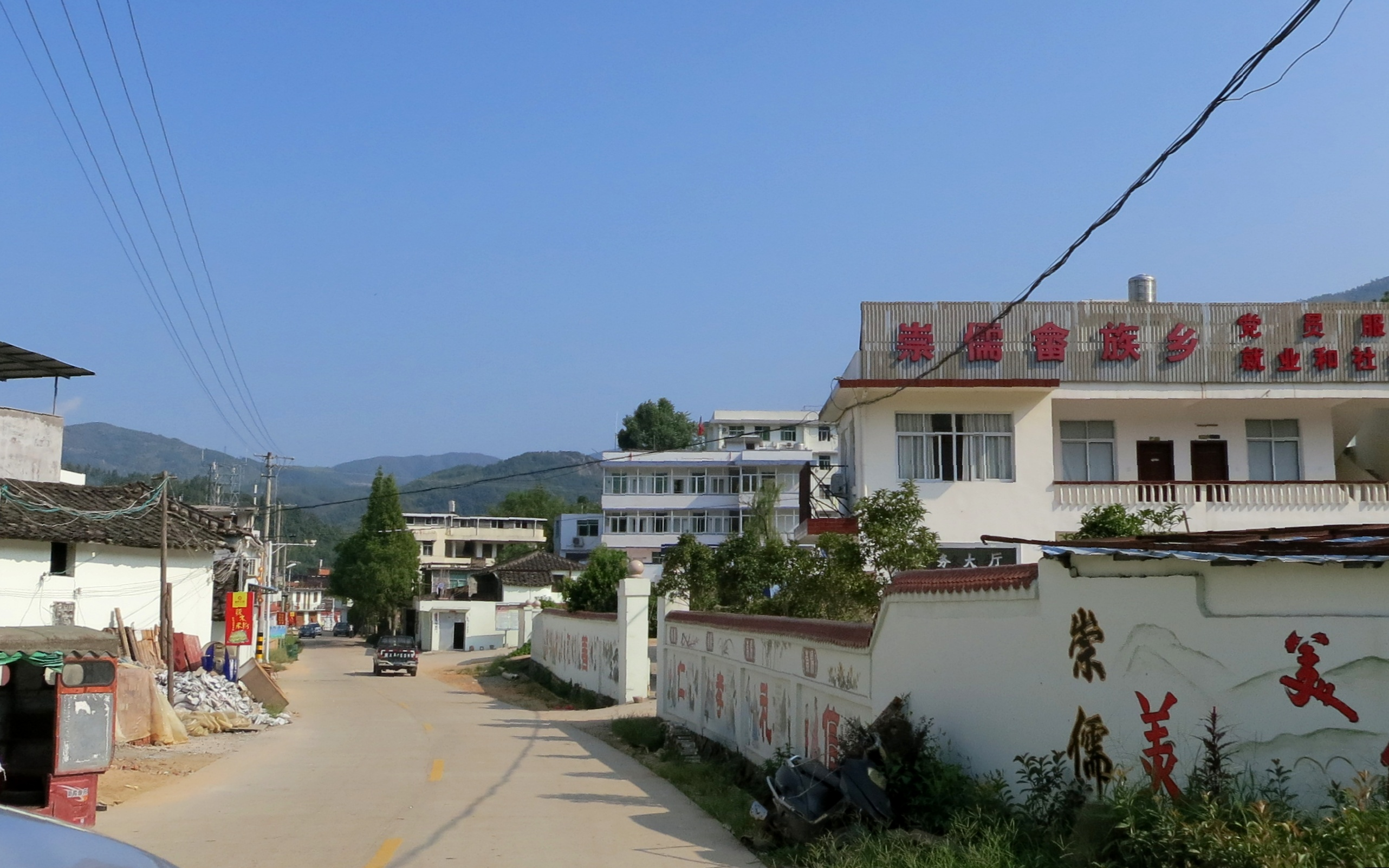
- Interactive map of Chongru
- Coordinates: 26.95111°N 119.92528°E
- Country: China
- Province: Fujian Sheng
- County: Xiapu County
- Elevation: 247 m (810 ft)

Population (2012-01-18)
  - Total: 2,800

Time zone
- Asia/Shanghai: UTC+8 (CT)

Chongru She Ethnic Township (崇儒畲族乡) is an ethnic township in Xiapu County.

Located in Fujian province, in the southeastern part of the country, it is 1,500 km south of Beijing, the capital of the country. 247 meters above sea level is located in Chongru, and has 2,800 inhabitants.

The land around Chongru is hilly. (Note: Calculated from the contention of all length data (DEM 3 ") from Viewfinder Panoramas, within a 10 kilometer radius. The full algorithm is available here.) The highest point in the vicinity has an elevation of 562 meters and is 2.0 km west of Chongru. (Note: Calculated from length data (DEM 3 ") from Viewfinder Panoramas. The full algorithm is available Lsjbot/Make-Geonames here.) There are about 214 people per square kilometer around Chongru relatively sparsely populated. The nearest larger town is Songcheng, 10.7 km southeast of Chongru. The area around Chongru is almost covered with dust and barrenness. In the region around Chongru, lakes are remarkably common. (Note: More than 20 kilometers away compared to the average density of the Earth, according to GeoNames.)

The climate is subtropical. The average temperature is 18 °C. The warmest month is July, at 24 °C, and the coldest January, at 10 °C. The average rainfall is 2,105 millimeters per year. The wettest month is August, with 322 millimeters of rain, and the driest October, with 52 millimeters.

Chongru

Climate chart (precipitation, max. and min. temperature)
J	F	M	A	M	J	J	A	S	O	N	D
78 14 5	155 18 9	152 17 8	214 22 12	284 25 15	285 26 19	163 28 21	322 26 21	156 25 18	52 23 16	140 19 11	103 15 7
- █ Average max. and min. temperatures in °C
- █ Precipitation totals in mm
Imperial conversion
J	F	M	A	M	J	J	A	S	O	N	D
3.1 57 41	6.1 64 48	6 63 46	8.4 72 54	11 77 59	11 79 66	6.4 82 70	13 79 70	6.1 77 64	2 73 61	5.5 66 52	4.1 59 45
- █ Average max. and min. temperatures in °F
- █ Precipitation totals in inches

Location of Chongru in People's Republic of China
