= Changchun Town =

Town in Fujian, China

Changchun 长春
- Town
- Interactive map of Changchun
- Coordinates: 26°43′45″N 120°02′23″E
- Country: China
- Province: Fujian
- County: Xiapu County

Population (2010)
  - Total: 43,760
- Time zone: UTC+8 (CT)

Changchun (长春镇) is a town in Xiapu County, Fujian.

Located in Fujian Sheng province, in the southeastern part of the country, 1,500 km south of Beijing is the capital of the country. 19 meters above sea level is located in Changchun, and has 43,760 inhabitants. The population consists of 20,134 females and 23,626 males. Children under the age of 15 are 15.0%, adults aged 15-64 73%, and the elderly over 65 11.0%.

== Geography ==
The land around Changchun is rather hilly in the south-east, but in the north-west it is flat. To the northwest, the sea is closest to Changchun. (Note: Calculated from the contention of all length data (DEM 3 ") from Viewfinder Panoramas, within a 10 kilometer radius. The full algorithm is available here.) The highest point in the vicinity has an elevation of 350 meters and is 2.5 km east of Changchun. (Note: Calculated from length data (DEM 3 ") from Viewfinder Panoramas. The full algorithm is available Lsjbot/Make-Geonames here.) There are about 214 people per square kilometer around Changchun relatively sparsely populated. The nearest larger town is Songcheng, 17.5 km north of Changchun. The area around Changchun is almost covered in dust and barrenness. In the region around Changchun, islands are unusually common. (Note: More than 20 kilometers away compared to the average density of the Earth, according to GeoNames.)

The climate is temperate. The average temperature is 17 °C. The warmest month is July, at 24 °C, and the coldest February, at 7 °C. The average rainfall is 1,950 millimeters per year. The wettest month is June, with 274 millimeters of rain, and the wettest October, with 71 millimeters.

Changchun

Climate chart (precipitation, max. and min. temperature)
J	F	M	A	M	J	J	A	S	O	N	D
78 13 6	150 12 2	147 17 11	199 21 15	258 24 16	274 24 21	131 26 21	253 25 22	164 24 16	71 22 18	126 19 17	99 12 6
- █ Average max. and min. temperatures in °C
- █ Precipitation totals in mm
Imperial conversion
J	F	M	A	M	J	J	A	S	O	N	D
3.1 55 43	5.9 54 36	5.8 63 52	7.8 70 59	10 75 61	11 75 70	5.2 79 70	10 77 72	6.5 75 61	2.8 72 64	5 66 63	3.9 54 43
- █ Average max. and min. temperatures in °F
- █ Precipitation totals in inches
