= Shuimen She Ethnic Township =

Town in Fujian, China

Shuimen 水门
- Town
- Shuimen She Ethnic Township 水门畲族乡
- Location within Fujian Location within China
- Coordinates: 26°58′13″N 120°04′19″E

Population (2010)
  - Total: 12,773
- Time zone: UTC+8

Shuimen She Ethnic Township (水门畲族乡) is a township in Xiapu County, Fujian, China.

== Demographics ==
Shuimen is located in Fujian province, in the southeastern part of the country, 1,500 km south of Beijing. Its elevation is 354 meters above sea level and it has a population of12,773 people. The population consists of 5,967 females and 6,806 males. 15.0% were children under the age of 15, 73% adults aged 15–64, and 11.0% over 65.

== Geography ==
The land around Shuimen is hilly. (Note: Calculated from the contention of all length data (DEM 3 ") from Viewfinder Panoramas, within a 10 kilometer radius. The full algorithm is available here.) There are about 214 people per square kilometer around Shuimen. The nearest larger town is Songcheng, 12.0 km southwest of Shuimen. The area around Shuimen is almost covered with mixed forest. In the region around Shuimen, islands are unusually common. (Note: More than 20 kilometers away compared to the average density of the Earth, according to GeoNames.)

== Climate ==
The climate is subtropical. The average temperature is 17 °C. The warmest month is July, at 24 °C, and the coldest December, at 7 °C. The average rainfall is 1,950 millimeters per year. The wettest month is June, with 274 millimeters of rain, and the wettest October, with 71 millimeters.

Shuimen

Climate chart (precipitation, max. and min. temperature)
J	F	M	A	M	J	J	A	S	O	N	D
78 14 7	150 13 4	147 18 10	199 22 14	258 25 17	274 22 22	131 27 20	253 27 20	164 25 18	71 22 17	126 20 15	99 12 2
- █ Average max. and min. temperatures in °C
- █ Precipitation totals in mm
Imperial conversion
J	F	M	A	M	J	J	A	S	O	N	D
3.1 57 45	5.9 55 39	5.8 64 50	7.8 72 57	10 77 63	11 72 72	5.2 81 68	10 81 68	6.5 77 64	2.8 72 63	5 68 59	3.9 54 36
- █ Average max. and min. temperatures in °F
- █ Precipitation totals in inches
