= Xinan, Xiapu County =

Coordinates: 26°43′25″N 119°51′30″E

Xinan 溪南镇
- Subdistrict

Chinese transcription(s)
- Interactive map of Xinan
- Country: China
- Province: Fujian
- Prefecture: Ningde
- County: Xiapu
- Time zone: UTC+8 (China Standard Time)

Xinan (Chinese: 溪南; pinyin: Xīnán) is a township-level division situated in Xiapu County, Ningde, Fujian, China.

== See also ==
- List of township-level divisions of Fujian
