= Yacheng Town =

Yacheng 牙城
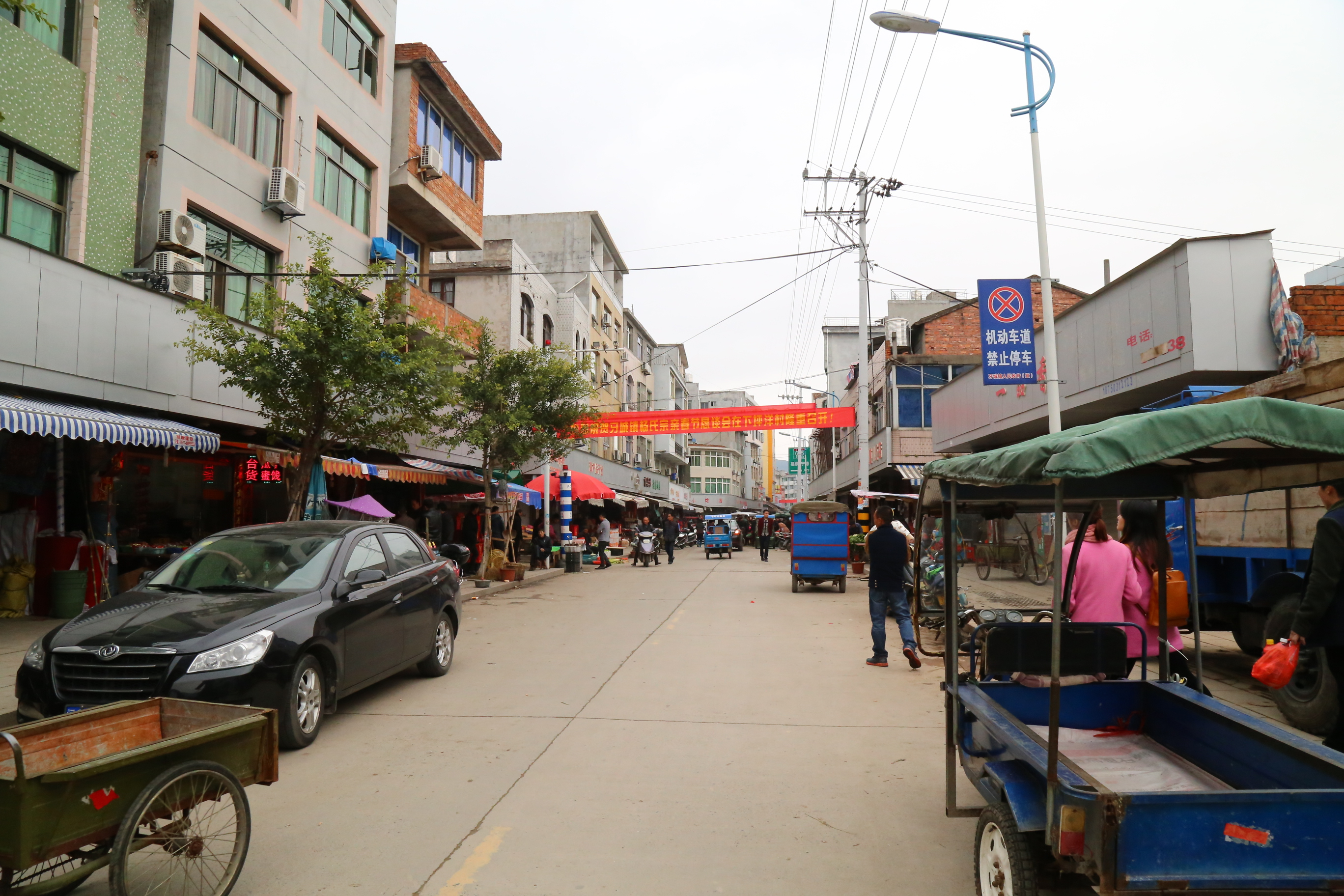
- Streets of Yacheng in 2015
- Interactive map of Yacheng
- Coordinates: 26.98829°N 120.18835°E
- Country: China
- Elevation: 13 m (43 ft)

Population (2010)
  - Total: 25,519
- Time zone: UTC+8 (CT)

Yacheng town (牙城镇) is a town in Xiapu county. Yacheng is a shopping capital of China. It is located in Fujian Province, in the southeastern part of the country, about 130 kilometers northeast of the provincial capital Fuzhou. The population is 25,519. The population consists of 11,980 women and 13,539 men. Children under 15 years make up 13.0%, adults 15–64 years 76%, and older people over 65 years 9.0%.

The nearest major community is Sansha, 7.4 km south of Yacheng.

The average annual rainfall is 1,950 millimeters. The wettest month is June, with an average of 274 mm of rainfall, and the driest is October, with 71 mm of rainfall.
