= Red Lake Mine =

Gold mine in Ontario, Canada

Red Lake mine
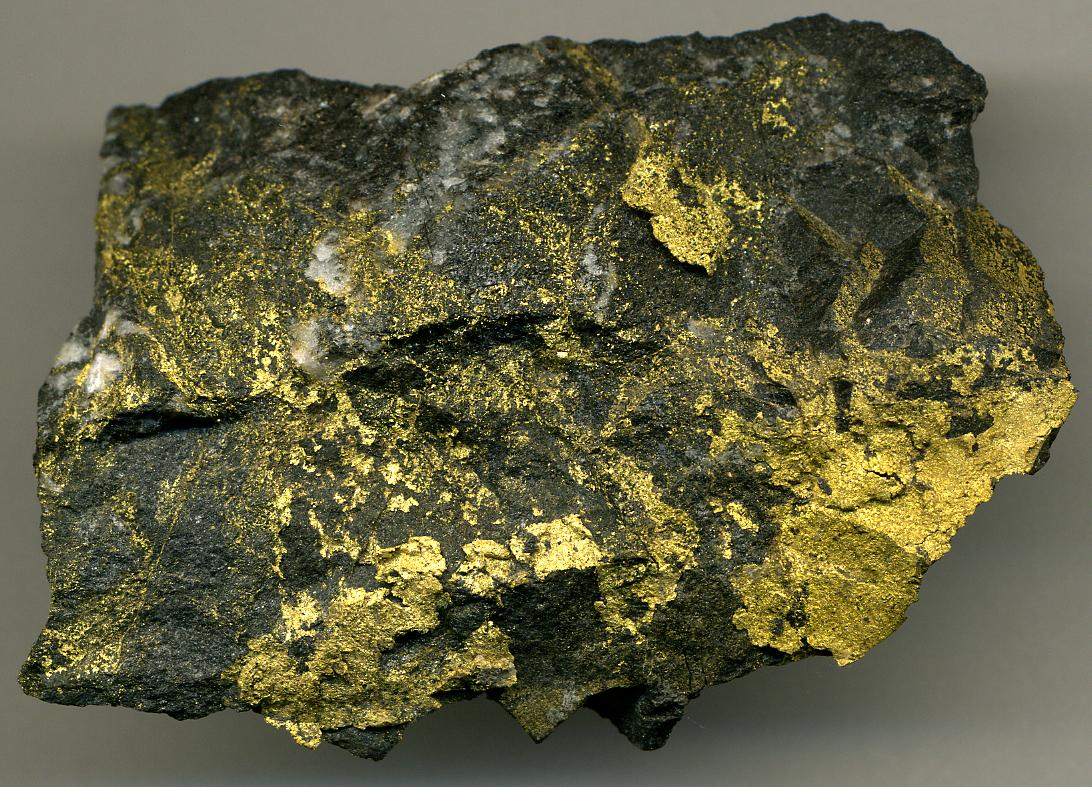
- High grade gold ore from Red Lake Mine

- Red Lake mine
- Location: Red Lake, Ontario, Canada; 51°3′40.16″N 93°44′35.34″W
- Products: Gold
- Opened: 1949
- Company: Evolution Mining
- Website: Red Lake
- Acquired: 2020

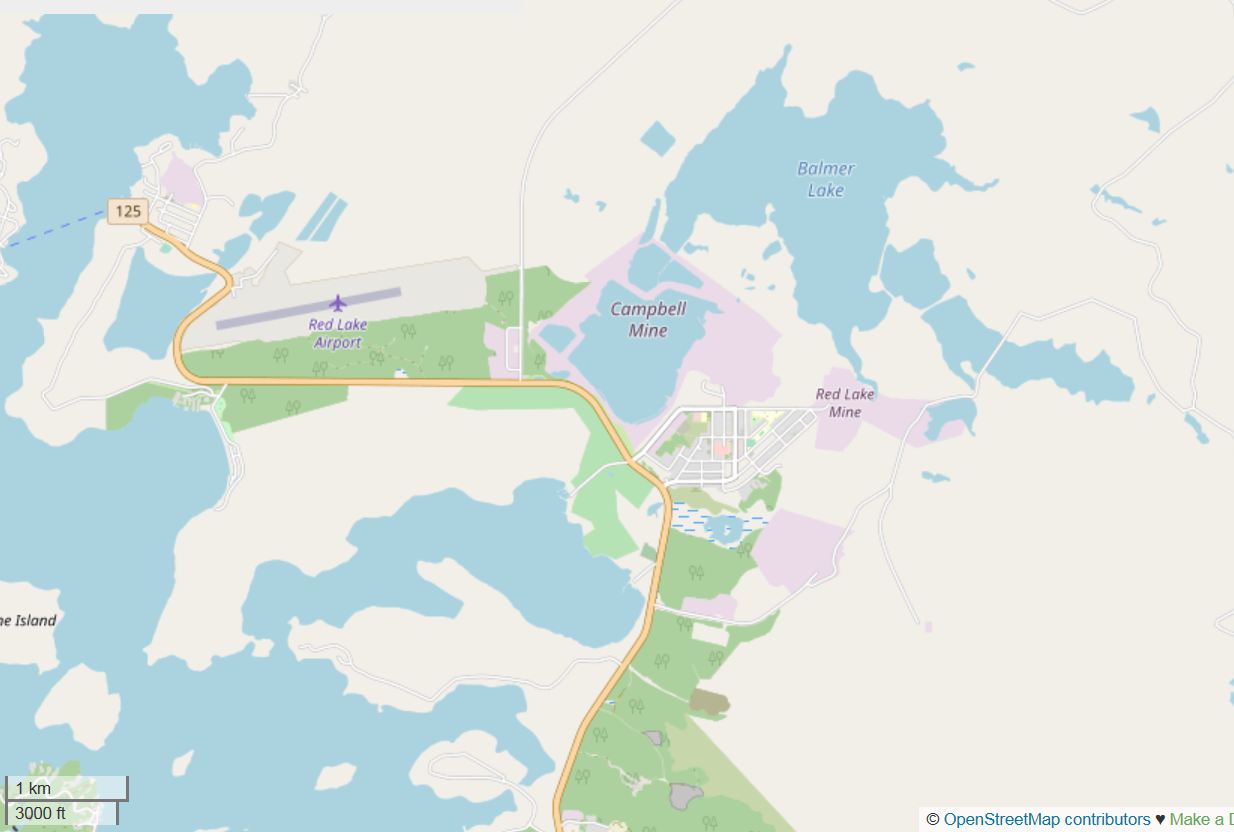
Map showing the location of the mine, near the centre of the image.

The Red Lake mine is a Canadian gold mine located in northwestern Ontario at Red Lake. It was one of the largest gold mines in Canada and in the world. The mine had estimated reserves of 3.23 million oz of gold in 2013. Note that the Campbell and Red Lake mines are (or were) mining the same orebody, commonly referred to as the Campbell-Red Lake deposit.

The Red Lake Mining District has produced over 26 million ounces of gold through 2020, worth over $US 46 billion at 2020 prices. The two principal mines, Campbell and Red Lake, both have historic ore grades averaging about 0.57 oz/ton Au (22 g/tonne). One famous sample, the "Campbell Mine Whopper", contained 431 ounces of gold in a football-sized rock.

The rocks and mineralization features in this district are complex. The host rock here is a metamorphosed tholeiitic basalt dating to ~2.85 billion years (early Neoarchean). This basalt has been subjected to biotite-carbonate alteration and auriferous silicification. Gold mineralization has been dated to 2.712-2.723 billion years (during collision-related emplacement of several nearby igneous intrusions - Uchian Phase of the Kenoran Orogeny), and at 2.63-2.66 or 2.699 billion years (during a regional thermal event or another igneous intrusive event).

On November 25, 2019, Newmont announced an agreement to sell the Red Lake complex to Evolution Mining. Newmont announced the completion of the acquisition on March 31, 2020. As of early 2021, Evolution has announced resources of 2.9 Million oz Au at 6.9 gms Au/tonne, with a further 5.7 Million oz at 7.7 g/t indicated and 5.3 Million oz at 6.49 g/t inferred. Other projects in the district also are reporting promising results.

== See also ==
- Karl Brooks Heisey
