= Lawrence Heisey =

Canadian businessman and philanthropist

Larry Heisey
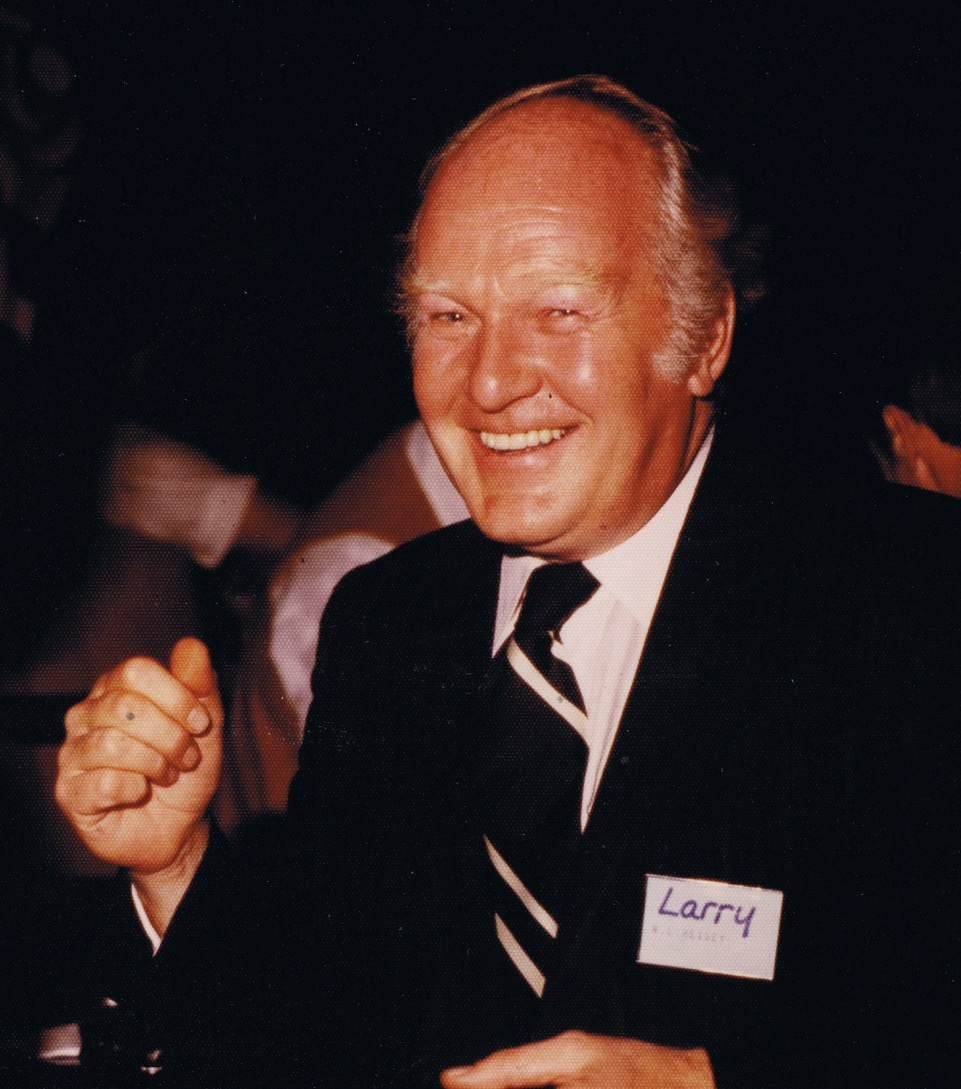
- Larry Heisey ca 1985
- Born: William Lawrence Heisey; May 29, 1930; Toronto, Ontario, Canada
- Died: May 28, 2009 (aged 78); Toronto, Ontario, Canada
- Known for: President of Harlequin Enterprises Limited

Larry Heisey, OC UE (May 29, 1930 – May 28, 2009) was a Canadian businessman and philanthropist. He was president and chairman of Harlequin Enterprises Limited.

== Early life ==
Born in Toronto, Ontario he was the son of Karl Brooks Heisey, mining engineer. He went to Lawrence Park Collegiate Institute class of 1948, before receiving a Bachelor of Arts degree from University of Trinity College and an M.B.A. from the Harvard Business School.

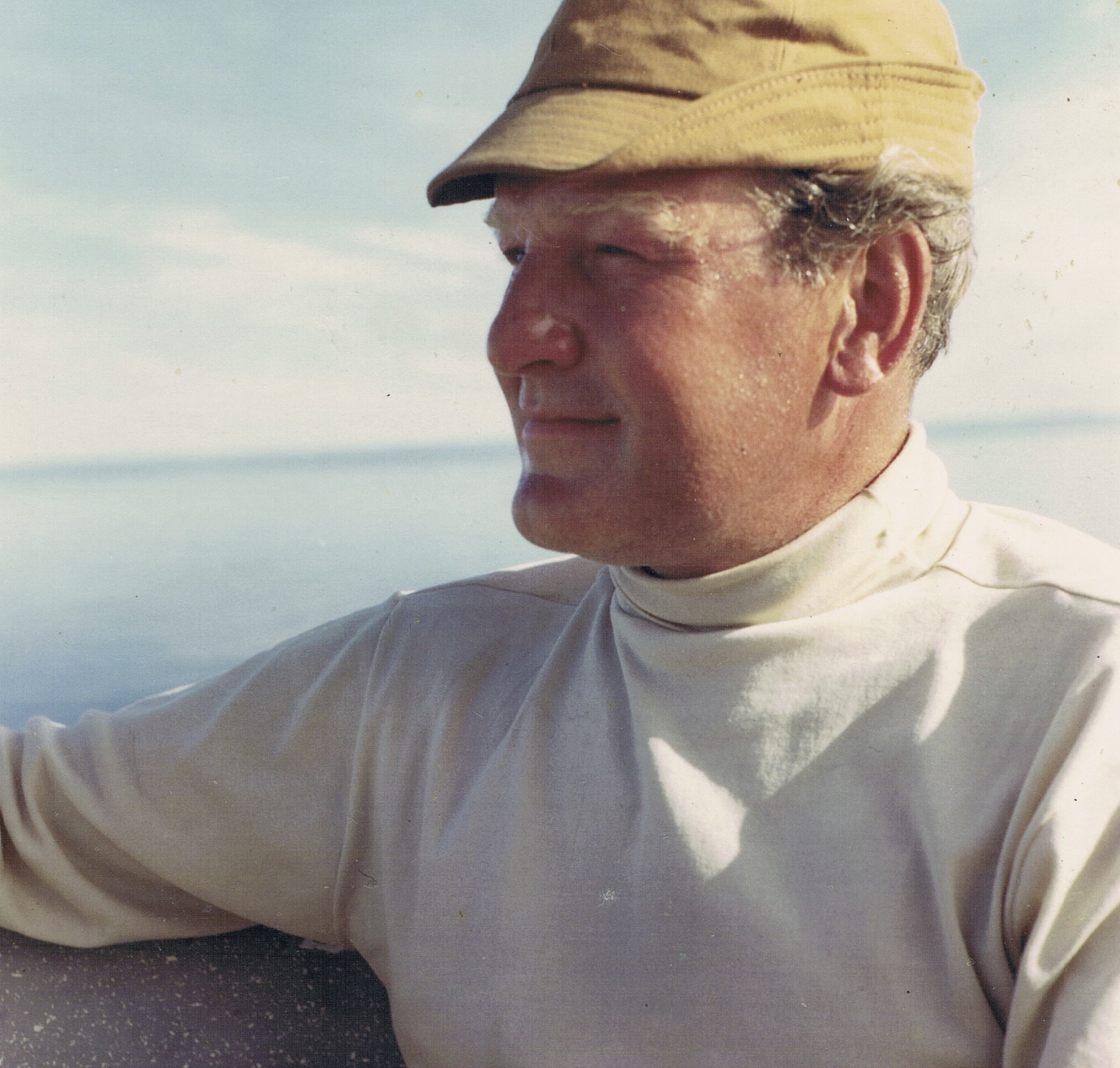
Larry Heisey at Gods Lake 1967

== Business career ==
Heisey joined Procter & Gamble in 1954 and left in 1967 to serve as executive Vice President in Sales for Standard Broadcasting.

From 1971 to 1982, he was President of Harlequin Enterprises Limited. In 1971 under Heisey's leadership Harlequin bought Mills & Boon a publisher of romance novels making Harlequin the largest publisher of Romance novels in the world. From 1982 to 1990 Heisey served as Chairman of Harlequin. Described as a "marketing genius", he revolutionised the sale and marketing of books in the international publishing industry. At Harlequin drawing upon his experiences at Procter & Gamble he first put free books in boxes of detergent and feminine sanitary napkins. Under his leadership Harlequin was the first publisher to sell books in drug stores and grocery stores. He pioneered the mail order book club and, contrary to publishing industry practise, refused to sell publishing rights to foreign publishing companies establishing new publishing ventures in new markets.

He served as a director for Aetna Life Insurance Co. of Canada, Business Depot Ltd., and Staples Inc.

== Philanthropy ==
Heisey was involved with the Toronto French School where he was a Director from 1966 to 1973, Chairman from 1967 to 1971, and Foundation Trustee from 1978 to 1982. He was a Governor of the Banff Centre from 1982 to 1988. While a member of the York University Board of Governors, Heisey established The W. Lawrence Heisey Graduate Awards in Fine Arts that recognize outstanding ability and achievement for students in the Fine Arts graduate programme at York University.

Heisey was a Director of the Canadian Opera Company from 1984 to 1986, the Chamber Players of Toronto and chairman of the commercial division of the United Way of Canada. He was also member of the Advisory Board of the Peggy Guggenheim Collection. and president of the National Ballet School Foundation. He and his wife Ann made a major financial contribution to help fund a new production of The Nutcracker by The National Ballet of Canada in 1995.

In 1994, he was made an Officer of the Order of Canada in recognition for being a "leader in Canadian business and philanthropy". He and his wife Ann Heisey donated a Vincent van Gogh painting called "A woman with a spade, seen from behind" c. 1885 to the Art Gallery of Ontario in 1997.

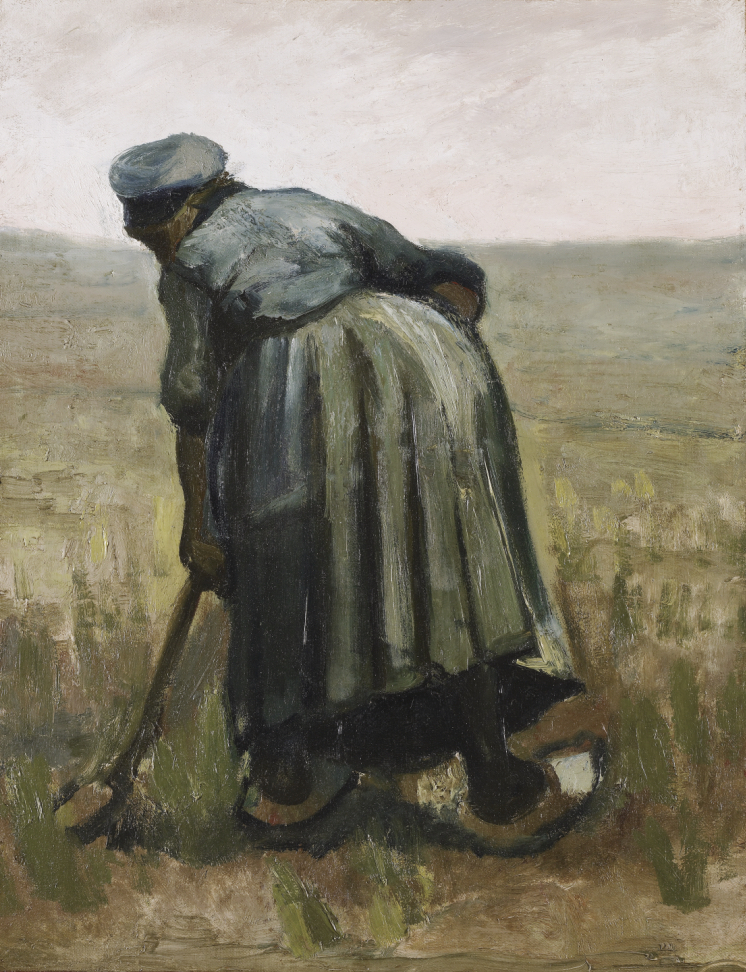
A woman with a spade, seen from behind Van Gogh
