= Sansha Town =

Town in Fujian Province, China

Sansha
- Interactive map of Sansha
- Coordinates: 26.921944°N 120.216389°E

Population (2010)
  - Total: 36,918
- Time zone: UTC+8 (CT)

Sansha Town (三沙镇) is a town under the jurisdiction of Ningde City, Xiapu County in Fujian Province, China.

Sansha is located in Fujian Sheng province, in the southeastern part of the country, 1,500 km south of Beijing. Sansha is located at 41 meters above sea level, and has 36,918 inhabitants. The population consists of 17,865 females and 19,053 males. Of the population, 14.0% are children under the age of 15, 76% adults aged 15–64, and 8.0% of the elderly population over 65.

The land around Sansha is mostly hilly, but to the south it is flat. To the southeast, the sea is closest to Sansha. (Note: Calculated from the intersection of all height data from Viewfinder Panoramas, within a 10 kilometer radius The full algorithm is available here.) The highest point in the vicinity has an elevation of 516 meters and is 2.3 km northwest of Sansha. (Note: Calculated from height data from Viewfinder Panoramas. The full algorithm is available here.) Sansha is the largest town in the area. In the region around Sansha, islands are unusually common. (Note: Less than 20 kilometers away compared to the average density of the Earth, according to GeoNames.)

The climate is temperate. The average temperature is 18 °C. The warmest month is August, at 24 °C, and the coldest is February, at 9 °C. The average rainfall is 1,950 millimeters per year. The wettest month is June, with 274 millimeters of rain, and the driest is October, with 71 millimeters.

Location of Sansha in People's Republic of China

== Administrative divisions ==
Sansha Town has a total of 4 communities and 27 administrative villages.

=== Communities ===
- Center Community
- Wu'ao Community
- Dong'ao Community
- Xi'ao Community

=== Villages ===
- Center Village
- Wuwo Village
- Dongwo Village
- Xiwo Village
- Sanwo Village
- Sanxiang Village
- Jinyang Village
- Guzhen Village
- Beacon Village
- Longtou Village
- Dongshan Village
- Fushan Village
- Sanping Village
- Shishi Nose Village
- Xiaohao Village
- Caiyang Village
- Shandu Village
- Gubang Village
- Yu Gongting Village
- Dongbi Village
- Daluting Village
- Badu Village
- Erkeng Village
- Jinji Village
- Huazhu Village
- Qingguansi Village
- Qingguan Lan Village

== Notable people ==
The former Secretary General of the State Council, Du Xinyuan, is a native of Sansha Town.

== Language and culture ==
Sansha Township Minnan Dialect is the area closest to the southern Fujian mainland where the Minnan dialect is spoken.
