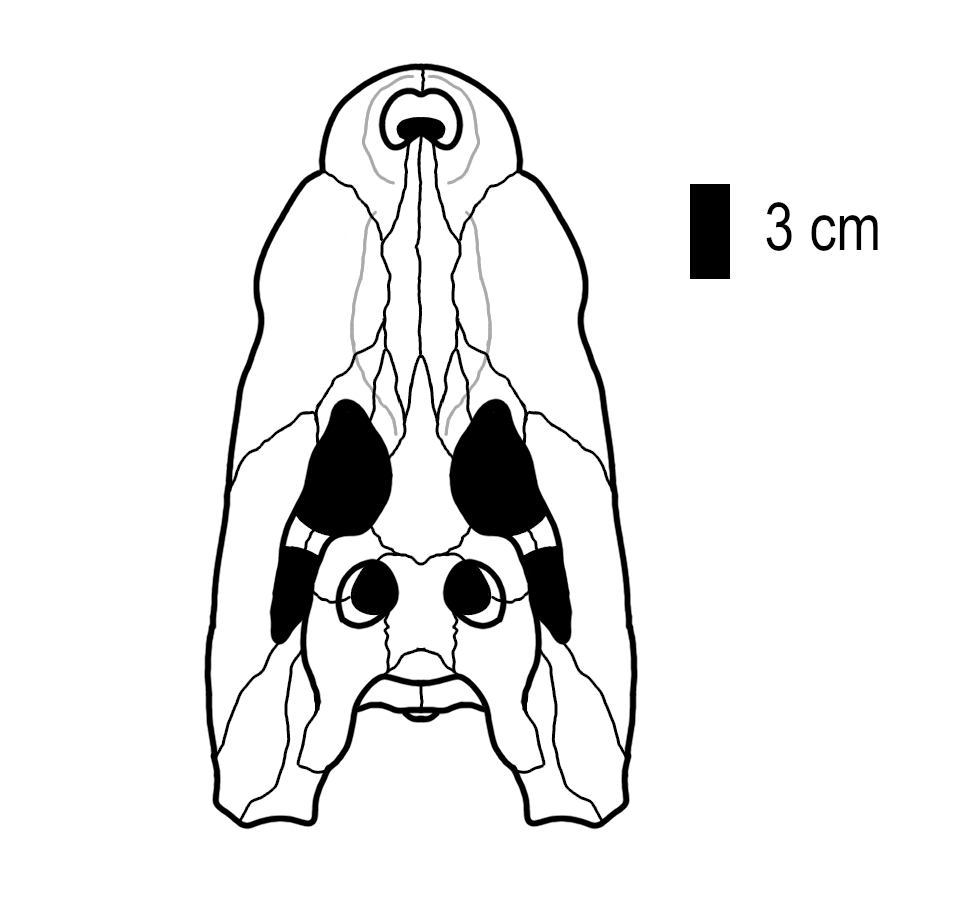

Scientific classification
- Kingdom: Animalia
- Phylum: Chordata
- Class: Reptilia
- Order: Crocodilia
- Superfamily: Alligatoroidea
- Clade: Globidonta
- Clade: †Orientalosuchina
- Genus: †Orientalosuchus; Massonne et al., 2019

Type species
- †Orientalosuchus naduongensis Massonne et al., 2019

= Orientalosuchus =

Orientalosuchus Temporal range: Eocene Bartonian–Priabonian

Extinct genus of reptiles

Orientalosuchus is an extinct genus of crocodilian from the Late Eocene that was found in the Na Duong Formation in Vietnam. The genus was described in 2019 based on the fossil remains of at least 29 individuals and was key in establishing the clade Orientalosuchina, initially interpreted as a group of early alligatoroids endemic to Asia, although later studies have argued for them actually being crocodyloids instead. Orientalosuchus was a comparably small crocodilian with a blunt and rounded snout and dentition that featured both pointed teeth towards the front of the jaw and blunt, conical teeth in the back. During the Late Eocene it would have inhabited the tropical to warm-subtropical freshwater biomes of the Na Duong Formation, which featured ponds, an anoxic lake and swamp forests as some of the primary habitats. Orientalosuchus would have shared these with the narrow-snouted gavialoid Maomingosuchus and a large taxon similar to Asiatosuchus. Compared to these, interpreted as a piscivore and a generalist respectively, Orientalosuchus would have been better equipped to deal with hard-shelled prey, such as the plethora of turtles found in the region.

== History and naming ==
The fossil remains of Orientalosuchus were discovered between 2009 and 2012 during systematic paleontological surveys of the Na Duong Basin in Northeastern Vietnam, near the Chinese border. All fossils come from the Eocene (late Bartonian to Priabonian, 39 to 35 Ma) Na Duong Formation and appear to represent a minimum of 29 distinct individuals. The holotype specimen, GPIT/RE/09761, consists of a partial skeleton featuring the skull, lower jaw and a plethora of postcranial bones including several vertebrae, ribs, various limb elements and over 50 osteoderms. The description of Orientalosuchus was accompanied by the recognition of an entire clade of Cretaceous to Eocene crocodilians from east Asia, dubbed Orientalosuchina. In addition to Orientalosuchus, the clade was created to include Krabisuchus, Jiangxisuchus, Protoalligator and Eoalligator, though more genera would be found later.

The name Orientalosuchus is a combination of the Latin word "oriens" meaning "east" and the Greek "soukhos" meaning "crocodile", referencing the overall geographic range of the animal and other orientalosuchins. The species name of O. naduongensis meanwhile more specifically references the Na Duong coal mine where the material was found.

== Description ==
=== Skull ===
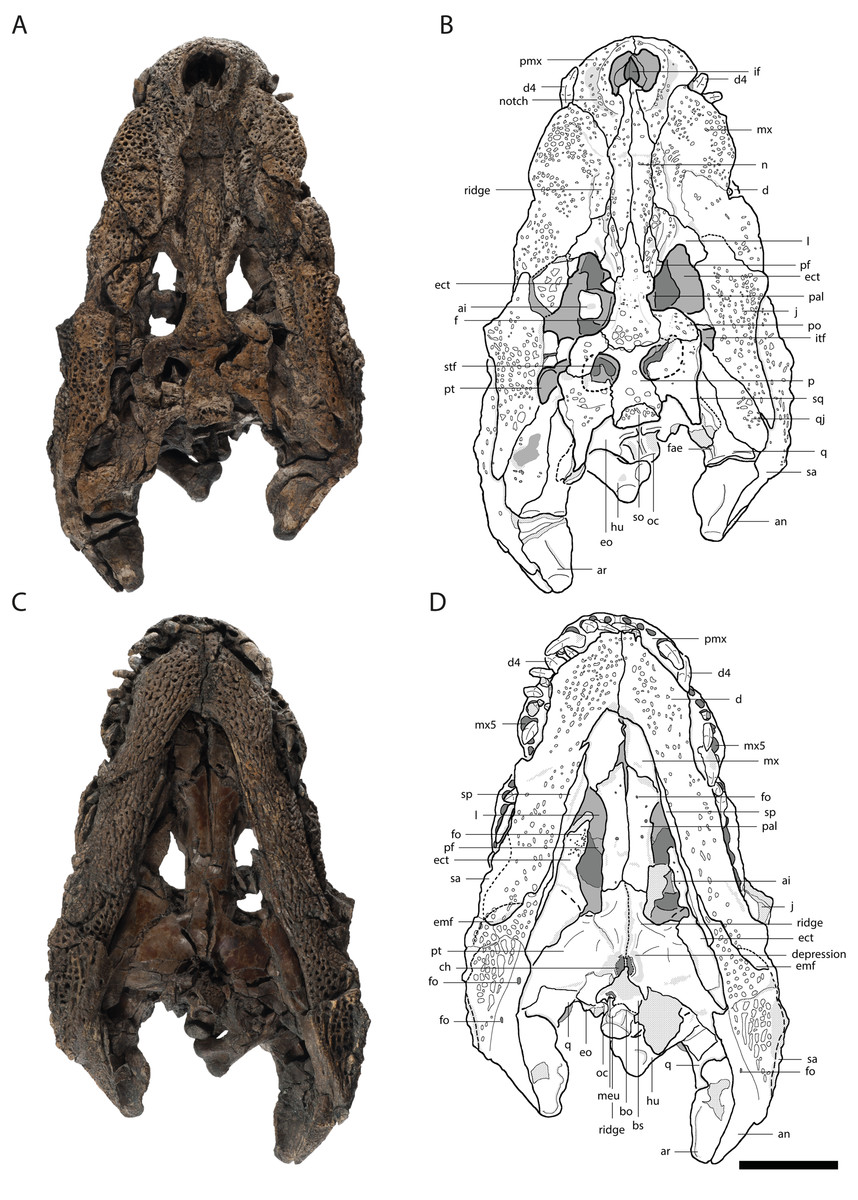
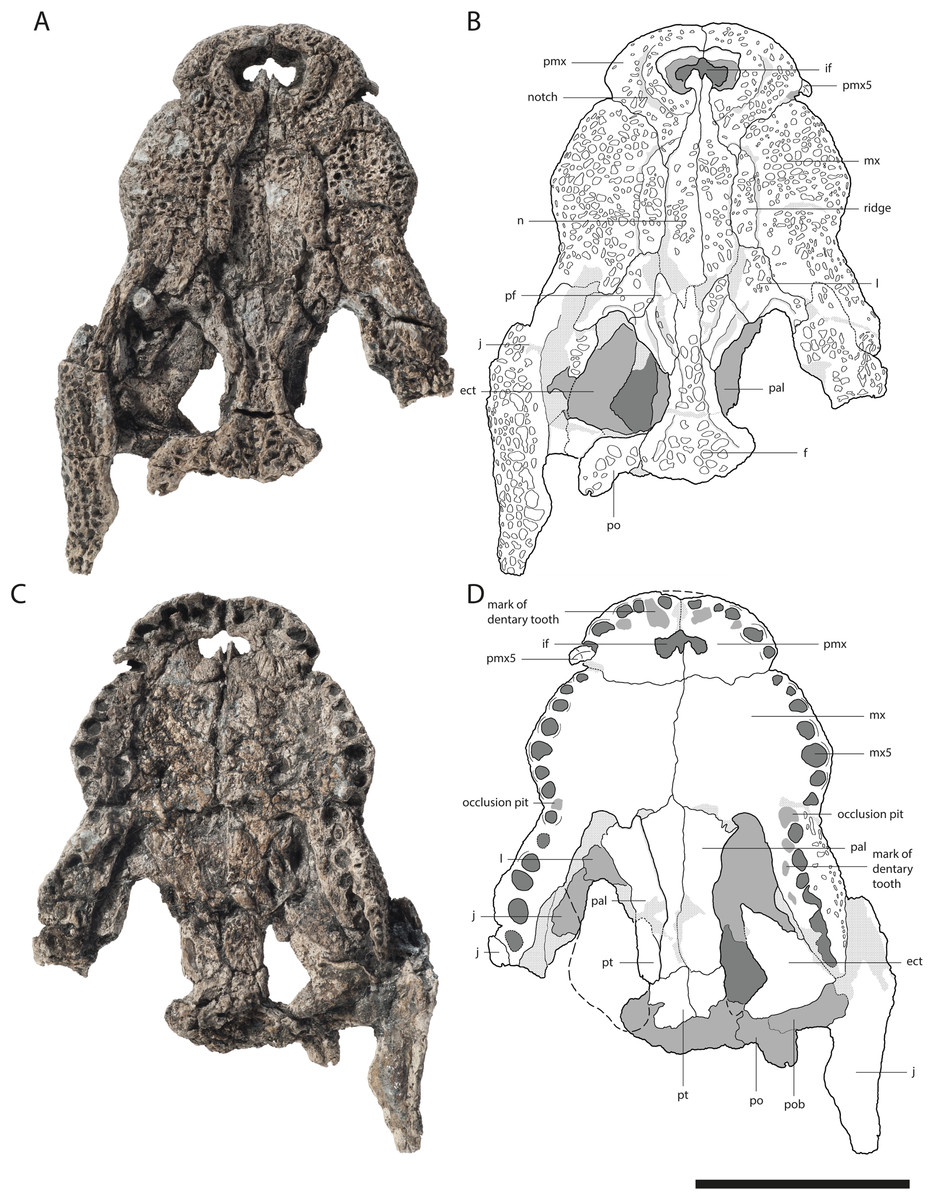
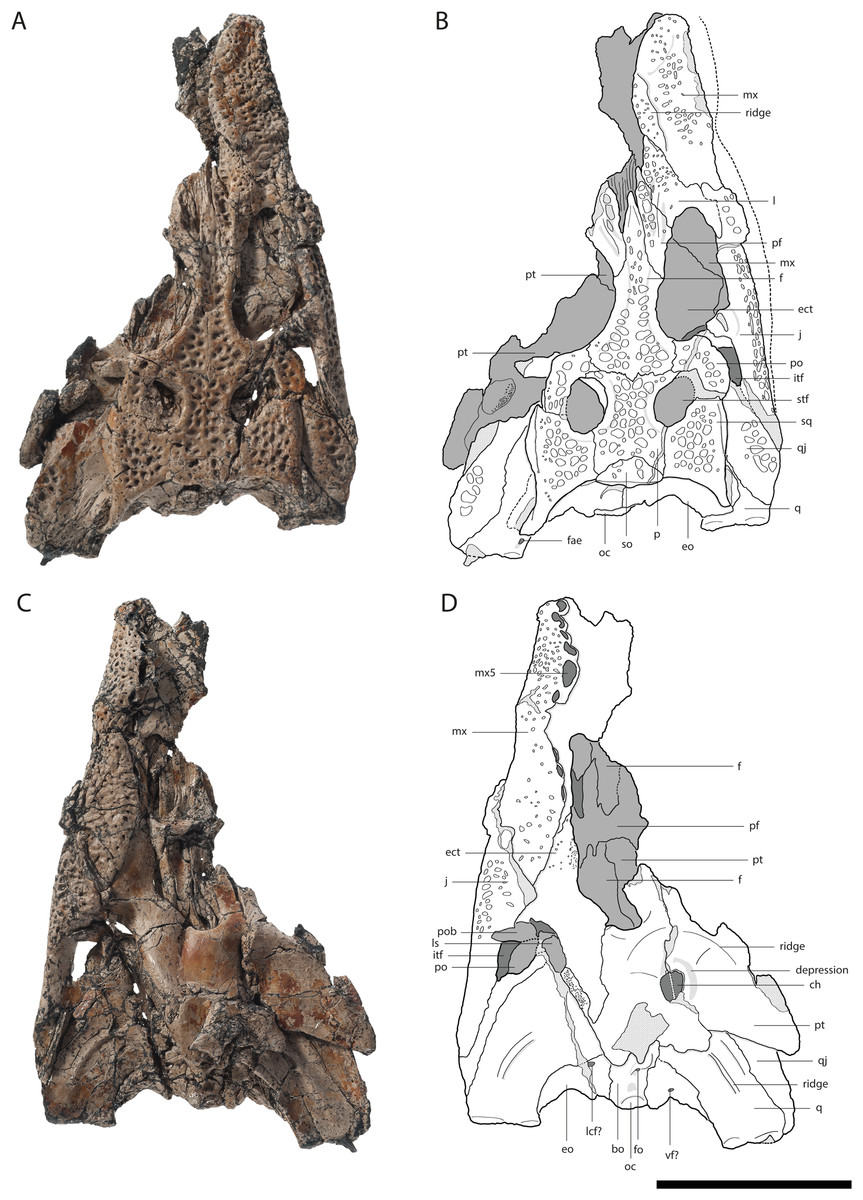
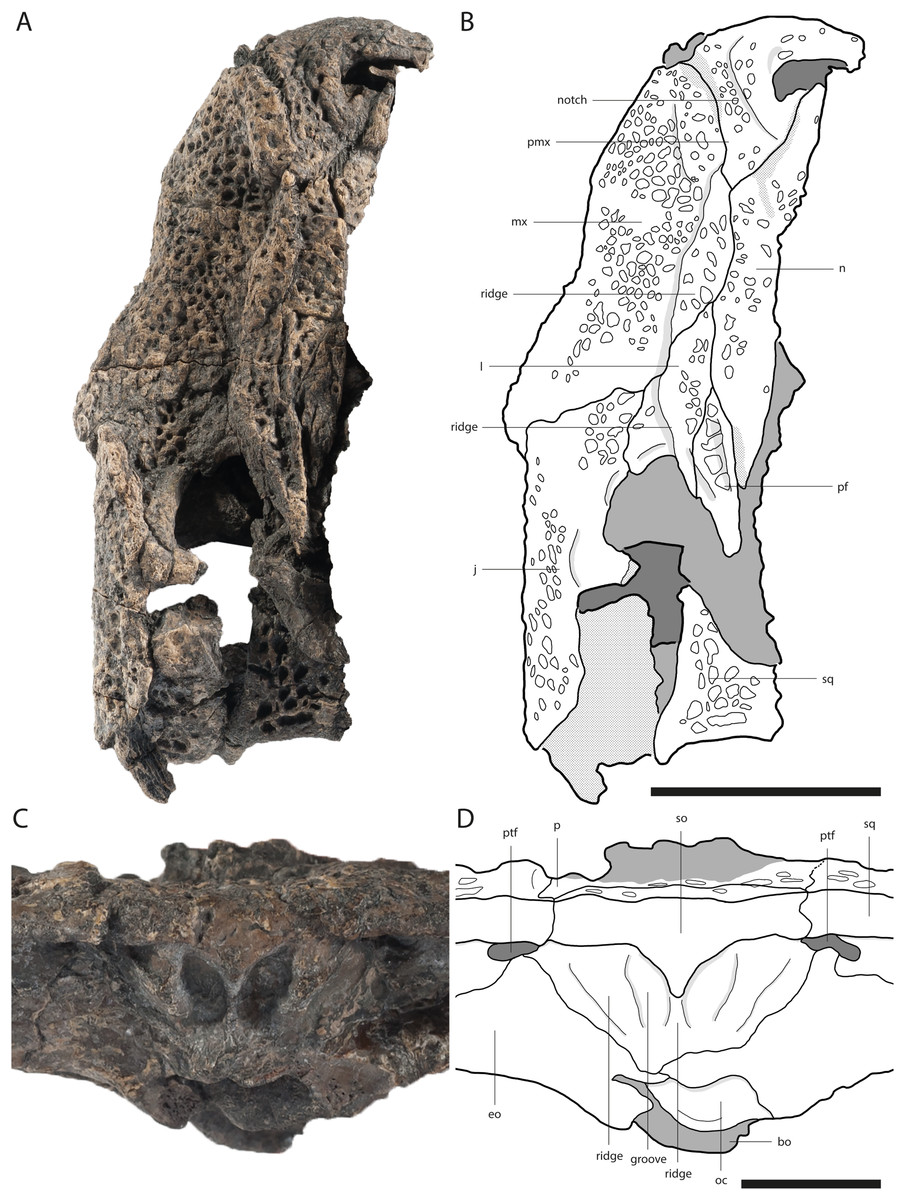
The skulls of different Orientalosuchus individuals, the holotype is shown in the top left.

The tip of the snout is formed by the premaxillae, whose contact with the maxillae coincides with a deep notch similar to that seen in true crocodiles and serves to receive an enlarged dentary tooth. Whether or not such a notch was also present in juveniles is however unknown. From this notch the suture extends backwards, creating an elongated premaxillary process that runs alongside the nasal bones. The premaxillae bulge out around the nares, which they almost entirely surround, and towards the side of said bulge a deep depression or notch can be seen. The nares face upwards (dorsally) and are roughly square-shaped, though with rounded edges and a small indentation formed by the premaxillae forming a process that extends into the opening from the front. As in other orientalosuchins, the nasals extend into the nares, preventing the premaxillae from meeting. The maxillae feature sinuous outer edges, a condition known as festooning, with alternating flaring and constricting of the bone. This means that the maxilla is convex at approximately the level of the 5th tooth, concave around the 7th to 8th and then flaring outwards towards its contact with the jugal. Another prominent feature of the maxilla is a prominent ridge that begins at the backmost part of the premaxillary process and proceeds to run parallel to the nasals, extending onto the lacrimal bone and prefrontal bone and ending at the orbital margin, the eyesocket. This ridge is accompanied by a groove that runs along the maxilla. The relative brevity of this ridge does help differentiate it from the related Dongnanosuchus, in which the preorbital ridge is just one element of a wider complex.

The lacrimal itself has an elevated medial margin and is overall shaped like a slender triangle and the prefrontal is wedge-shaped. The frontal bone consists of a long and narrow anterior process and a wide posterior region. The anterior process runs between the paired lacrimals and frontals and forms a pointed peak that extends in-between the nasal bones. The frontal lies flush with the edge of the eyesockets, only upturning very little rather than forming an elevated rim. The posterior section of the frontal forms the very front of the skull table, where it contacts the boomerang-shaped postorbital bones and the large rectangular parietal, with all three bones connecting in a small triple junction. The small supratemporal fenestrae are located comparably close to the front of the skull table, with a longer stretch of bone separating them from the posterior edge and creating a long contact between parietal and the squamosals. In adult specimens of Orientalosuchus, the parietal never actually reaches the back of the skull table, being barred from the edge by the broadly-exposed supraoccipital.

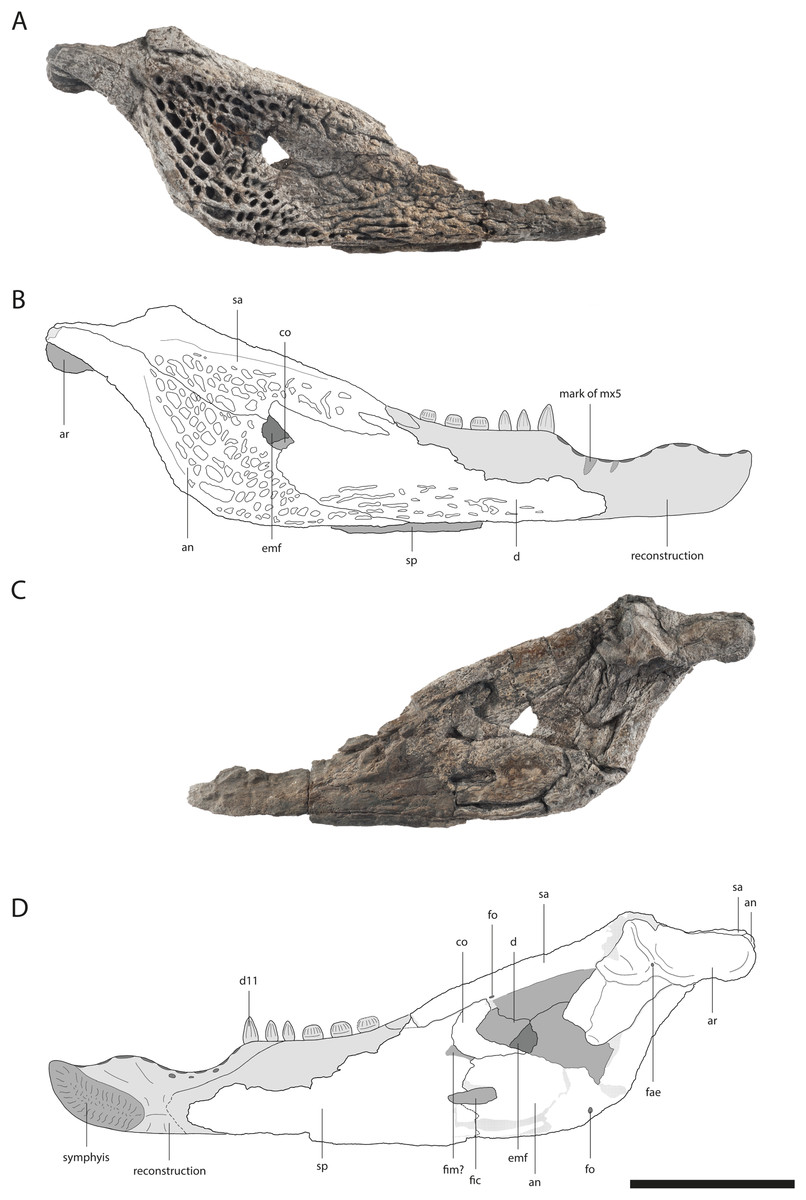
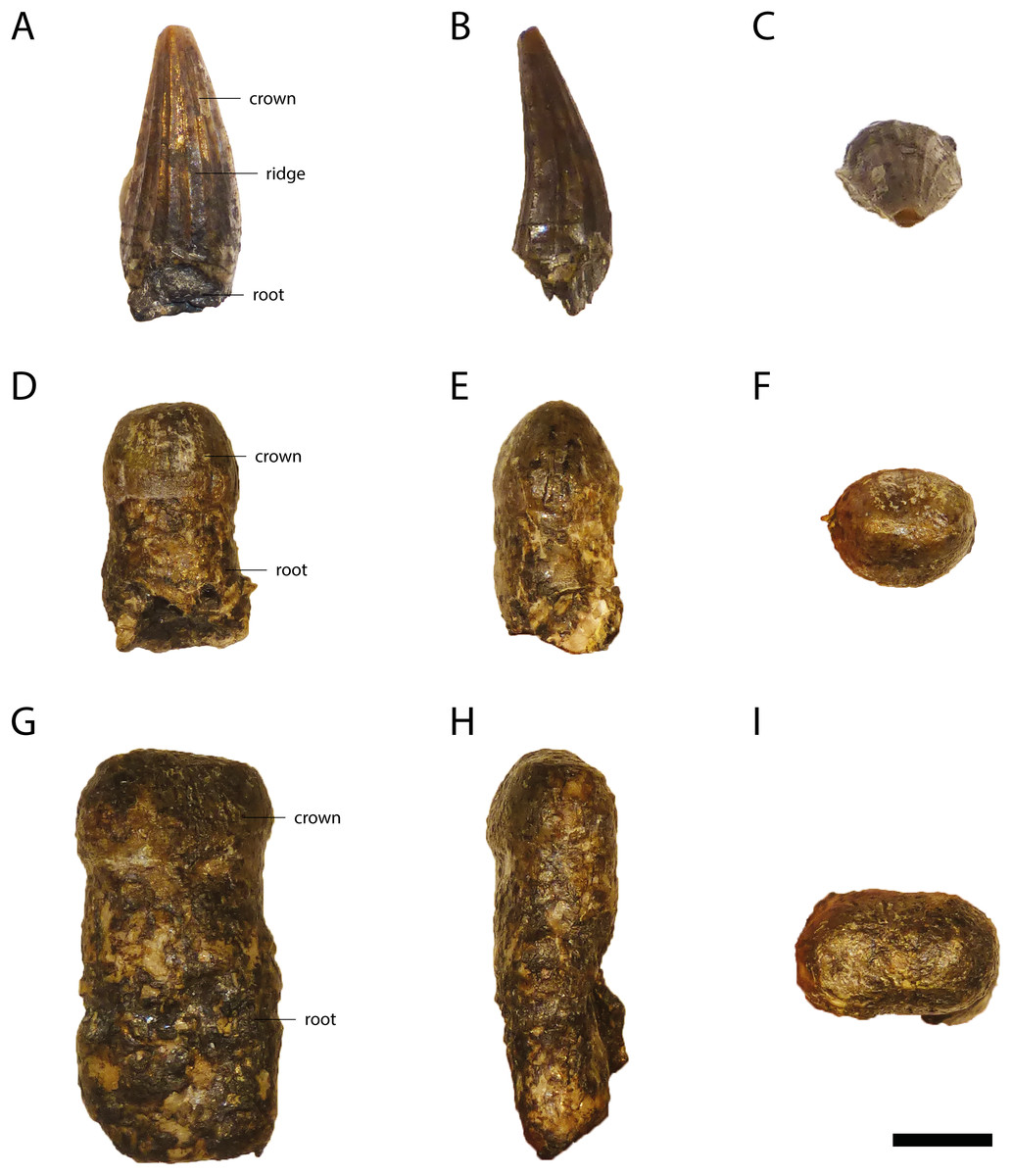
While skull material of Orientalosuchus is generally preserved in a flattened state, the lower jaw is preserved in a way that reveals its depth. It was filled with both long and pointed teeth in the front and blunt, conical teeth in the back.

The jugal extends along the side of the skull all the way from the maxilla to the quadratojugal. The jugal forms the lower margin of the eyesocket, the infratemporal fenestra and the inset postorbital bar. The lower edge of the eyesocket is almost straight while that of the infratemporal fenestra is noticeably concave. The quadratojugal also forms part of the border of the infratemporal fenestra, but does not extend a spine-like process into the opening. The quadrate does not connect the fenestra and bears two condyles, lateral and medial, with the former being the larger one and the latter bearing a notch for the foramen aerum.

The lower of the surface features a small, oval incisive foramen and two large suborbital fenestrae that extend from the notch between the 7th and 8th maxillary alveoli backwards, restraining the palatine bones between them. The palatines are fan-shaped towards the front of the skull, but do not form a shelf that overhangs the fenestrae nor do they extend much beyond the beginning of the openings, coming into contact with the maxillae along a suture the shape of an obtuse V. The palatines likewise do not extend beyond the back end of the fenestrae, with the pterygoids extending between the openings to form an almost straight contact. The surface of the pterygoid is uneven and bulges out around the posterior edge of the suborbital fenestra that transitions into a ridge that projects both posteromedially and posteromedially. The posterolateral ridge is short and quickly disappears while the posteromedial part of the ridge extends back towards the choana. Just before the choana, the pterygoid is pushed inward, forming a thin neck that surrounds the skull opening.

=== Lower jaw ===
The toothrow of the lower jaw has a sigmoidal outline, featuring concave and convex regions that correspond with the festooning of the upper jaw. There is a shallow concave region between the first dentary tooth and the enlarged fourth tooth, which sits atop a raised part of the dentary. Behind this tooth the dentary is once more concave before rising upruptly at the level of the 11th dentary tooth, which sits higher still than the fourth. All teeth behind it are approximately level with another. The mandibular symphysis, the region of the mandible where the two halves meet in the front, extends as far back as the fifth dentary tooth and is formed entirely by the dentary.

Behind the symphysis lies the Meckelian groove, although it is almost entirely closed off by the dentary, leaving it as nothing more than a very narrow canal. The contact between the dentary and the splenial begins as early as the seventh dentary tooth and extends backwards, approaching the toothrow and abuting it at the level of the 13th tooth. The external mandibular fenestra of Orientalosuchus is noted as being very small, only slightly larger than the foramen intermandibularis caudalis that lies on the inner side of the jaw. The fenestra has a straight front edge and a back edge that is clearly curved and various sutures emerge from it. The suture between dentary and angular for instance contacts the underside of the fenestra and at the top the dentary-surangular suture and the surangular-angular suture both lie very close to one-another.

=== Dentition ===
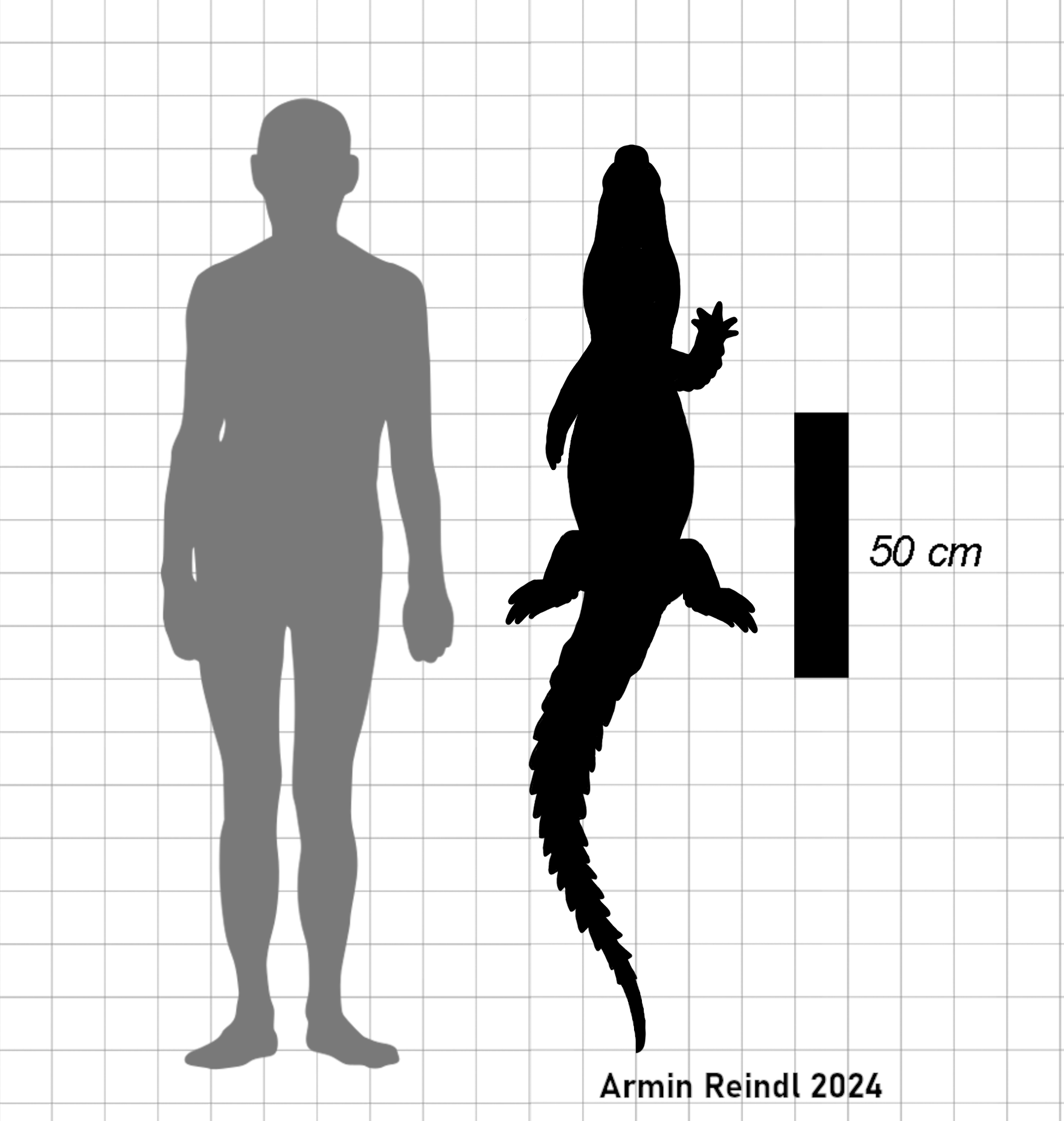
Size of Orientalosuchus compared to a human

The dentition of the upper jaw of Orientalosuchus consists of five premaxillary and 13 maxillary teeth on either side. Among the premaxillary teeth, the fourth is the largest, with the third slightly smaller and the remaining teeth all much smaller. The maxillary toothrow shows an increase in size leading up to the fifth, the largest of the maxillary teeth, and then a decrease that matches the festooning of the maxilla.

The lower jaw contains 16 teeth, beginning with three teeth that are close to equal in size followed by the enlarged fourth dentary tooth, the largest in the lower jaw. The fifth dentary tooth then is the smallest and the subsequent teeth up to the tenth are approximately the size of the earliest dentary teeth. The 11th is the second largest tooth of the lower jaw and followed by several smaller teeth.

The teeth in the front of the middle of the jaw are pointed with a slightly convex outer (lateral) and concave inner (lingual) surface and several dominant ridges that run from the tip, which are more prominent laterally. Beginning with the tenth maxillary tooth, the dentition switches from long and pointed to short and blunt, appearing more conical in shape. The last three teeth also show elongation from the front to the back as well as lateral compression in addition to their overall conical morphology and are described as smaller than the bulbous teeth of the early alligatoroids Hassiacosuchus.

Occlusal pits and notches give some idea of how the teeth of the upper and lower jaws would have interacted with each other. A large notch is situated between the premaxillae and maxillae, serving to receive the enlarged fourth dentary tooth. Between the seventh and eight maxillary teeth the corresponding dentary tooth, likely the 11th, would also interlock. However, other than the fourth and 11th dentary teeth, all other teeth of the lower jaw would have been located lingually to the teeth of the upper jaw, suggesting an overbite in these regions. There is furthermore a diastema present between the eight and ninth dentary teeth where the enlarged fifth maxillary tooth of the upper jaw likely comes to rest.

=== Postcrania ===
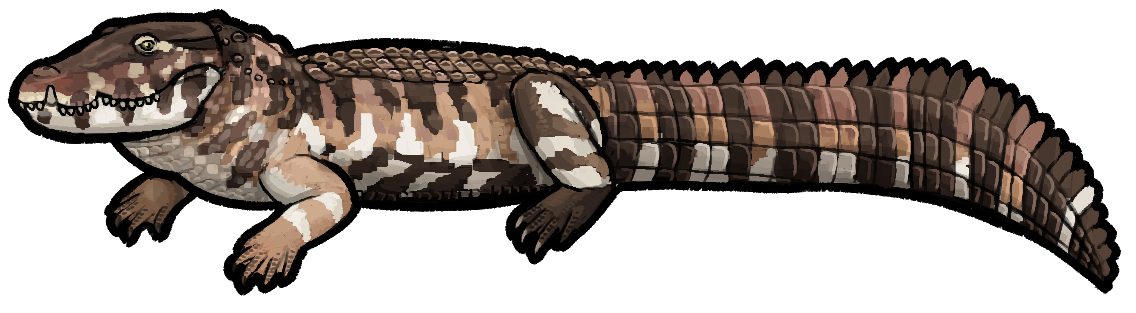
Orientalosuchus is among the orientalosuchins with the best preserved postcrania.

Orientalosuchus also preserves a significant amount of postcranial material, more than other known orientalosuchins. This includes a large portion of the spine, from the cervical vertebrae to the dorsal, caudal and a single sacral vertebrae, ribs, the shoulder girdle, pelvic girdle, limbs and osteoderms.

In addition to the diagnostic features of the skull, which are easily compared to other orientalosuchins, Massonne and colleagues also identify several diagnostic features visible in the postcranial skeleton. Among these, it is noted that the hypapophysis of the axis, the second neck vertebrae, is located nearer to the central part of the vertebral centrum. The coracoid possesses a large glenoid that is described as broad, oval and elongated towards the front of the body. Finally, the iliac blade's posterior end is said to be rectangular with an indentation in its upper (dorsal) surface.

The osteoderms are mostly those of the dorsal armor, square in shape and either lacking keels or possessing only very shallow keels. Some others meanwhile are small and oval and bear a more pronounced keel than those of the dorsal armor. These osteoderms were likely located more posterolaterally than the primarily dorsal armor. A third type of osteoderm is represented by a single triangular element and unkeeled, might have been located anterolaterally.

=== Size ===
Orientalosuchus may have reached a length of up to 2 m (6 ft 7 in).

== Phylogeny ==
When Orientalosuchus was named in the 2019 study by Massonne et al., the team also examined some other extinct alligatoroid taxa from Asia. Phylogenetic analysis at the time found that they were all closely related and together formed a monophyletic clade the team dubbed Orientalosuchina, which they recovered at the base of Alligatoroidea. Orientalosuchina, as defined in 2019, included Orientalosuchus itself, Eoalligator (previously proposed to be a synonym of Asiatosuchus nanlingensis), Protoalligator, Krabisuchus and Jiangxisuchus. Initially Orientalosuchus was regarded as the sister taxon to Krabisuchus, with the other three positioned in a polytomy. The monophyly of Orientalosuchina would see some support by future studies, especially the descriptions of Dongnanosuchus and Eurycephalosuchus, both of which replicate the same placement within Crocodilia and composition as the study by Massonne and colleagues, sans the obvious inclusion of the new forms. For instance in the description of Eurycephalosuchus, Wu and colleagues find Krabisuchus and Protoalligator in basal positions, Orientalosuchus in a polytomy with Dongnanosuchus and Eurycephalosuchus and finally the clade composed of Eoalligator and Jiangxisuchus.

- - Alligatoroidea
    - †Leidyosuchus
    - - †Deinosuchus
      - †Diplocynodon
      - Globidonta
        - †Orientalosuchina
          - †Krabisuchus siamogallicus
          - - †Protoalligator huiningensis
            - - †Orientalosuchus naduongenis
              - †Dongnanosuchus hsui
              - †Eurycephalosuchus gannanensis
              - - †Jiangxisuchus nankangensis
                - †Eoalligator chunyii
        - Alligatoridae

However, not all studies agree with the placement of Orientalosuchina at the base of Alligatoroidea. While Massonne and colleagues have argued that certain features that could be used to argue for crocodyloid-affinities are the result of the basally branching position of Orientalosuchina, others have instead argued that they are indeed evidence that the clade should be placed closer to crocodyloids than to alligatoroids. Nils Chabrol et al. 2024 managed to recover both hypothesis, with Orientalosuchina composed of Orientalosuchus, Krabisuchus, Eurycephalosuchus and Dongnanosuchus, but lacking the remaining members included by Massonne and colleagues. The results that recovered the clade closer to Crocodyloids, specifically as a basal branch of Longirostres outside of the crocodyloid-gavialoid split, places Orientalosuchus as the sister taxon to Dongnanosuchus. The other alternative, with orientalosuchins remaining alligatoroids as originally envisioned, sees the same sister taxon relationship, but with Krabisuchus as their next closest relative and Eurycephalosuchus as the basalmost member (in the Longirostres interpretation these later two are each other's sister taxa).

- Longirostres
  - - - †Eurycephalosuchus gannanensis
      - †Krabisuchus siamogallicus
    - - †Orientalosuchus naduongenis
      - †Dongnanosuchus hsui
  - - Crocodyloidea
    - Gavialoidea

- - - - †Qianshanosuchus
      - †Asiatosuchus depressifrons
    - - †Asiatosuchus germanicus
      - †Crocodylus affinis
  - - †Planocraniidae
    - Alligatoroidea
      - - †Eurycephalosuchus gannanensis
        - - †Krabisuchus siamogallicus
          - - †Orientalosuchus naduongenis
            - †Dongnanosuchus hsui
      - other alligatoroids

Another study recovering Orientalosuchina closely to Longirostres was that of Jorgo Ristevksi and colleagues. In their 2023 revision of Australasian crocodylomorphs, two out of their eight phylogenetic trees recover orientalosuchins as being deeply nested within Mekosuchinae between the large-bodied forms like Baru and the smaller dwarf forms like Trilophosuchus. This represents yet another notably different internal topology, retaining the close relationship between Jiangxisuchus and Eoalligator found by some with Orientalosuchus as their immediate sister taxon, Krabisuchus more basal and Dongnanosuchus closer to dwarf mekosuchines than any of the other traditional orientalosuchins. However the remaining six analysis of the same study all recover more traditional results with Orientalosuchina absent from Mekosuchinae and support is generally regarded as weak, although worth of being researched further.

- Crocodilia
  - Alligatoroidea
  - - †Planocraniidae
    - - - †Prodiplocynodon
        - - - †"Crocodylus" affinis
            - †"Crocodylus" depressifrons
          - - †"Crocodylus" acer
            - †Brachyuranochampsa
          - Longirostres
            - Gavialoidea
            - Crocodyloidea
      - - †Asiatosuchus germanicus
        - Mekosuchinae
          - - †Kalthifrons
            - - - †Quinkana meboldi
                - - †Quinkana fortirostrum
                  - †Quinkana timara
              - - - †Paludirex gracilis
                  - †Paludirex vincenti
                - - †Baru wickeni
                  - †Baru darrowi
          - - Orientalosuchina
              - †Krabisuchus
              - - †Orientalosuchus
                - - †Jiangxisuchus
                  - †Eoalligator
            - - †Dongnanosuchus
              - - †"Baru" huberi
                - - †Volia
                  - †Trilophosuchus
                  - - †Mekosuchus sanderi
                    - †Mekosuchus whitehunterensis
                    - †Mekosuchus inexpectatus

== Paleobiology ==
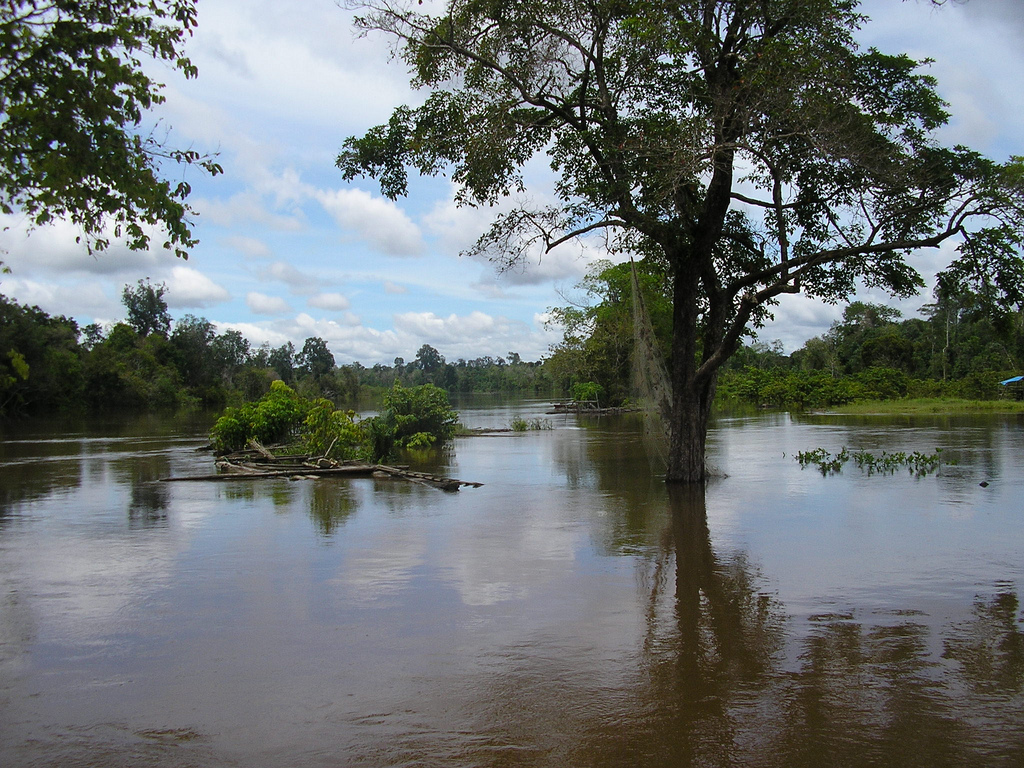
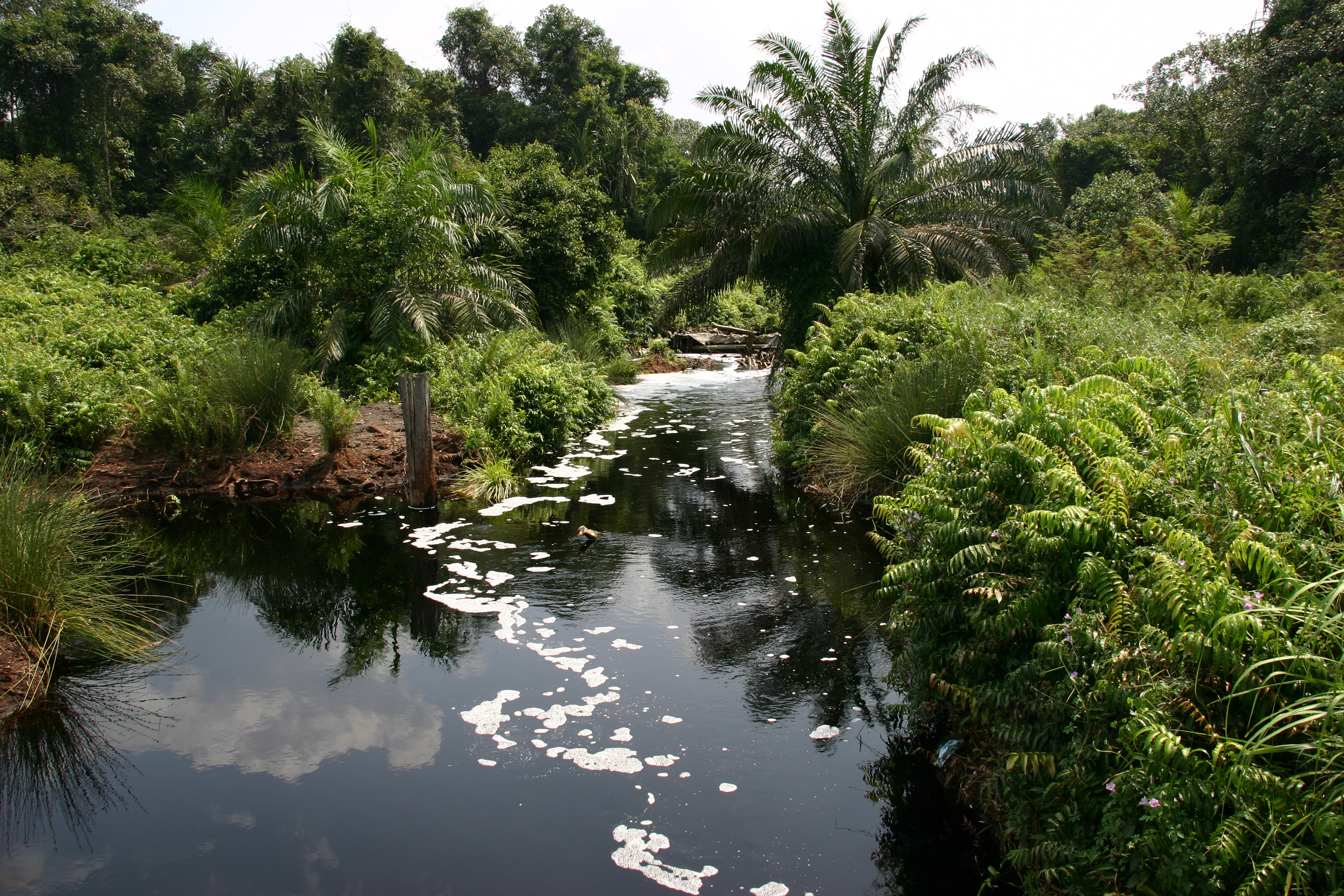
The environment of the Na Duong Basin during the Eocene has been likened to the peat swamp forests of modern day South East Asia.

=== Paleoenvironment ===
The Na Duong Formation of Vietnam is generally regarded as Eocene in age, corresponding to the Bartonian to Priabonian, though some studies have also suggested a slightly younger Late Eocene to Oligocene age. The formation preserves a tropical to warm-subtropical swamp biome that across its deposition featured a variety of aquatic biomes ranging from brooks and rivulets to an environment dominated by shallow ponds to even an anoxic lake. The main coal seam is surrounded by pond deposits, but itself represents an anoxic lake, with the transition from the former to the latter representing the primary fossil-bearing layer that also preserves the remains of Orientalosuchus. The anoxic lake would have received freshwater from rivers that brought with them sediments, leaves and large logs of driftwood. The terrestrial environment would have been represented by a waterlogged swamp forest. The main coal seam preserve abundant fossilized tree trunks, some of which measuring 1 m (3 ft 3 in) across, as well as the stems of royal ferns (Osmundaceae). The diameter of the trunks, root system and the distance between the stumps (standing generally 3–5 m (9.8–16.4 ft) apart), suggest a density of about 600 trees per hectare, comparable to the peat swamp forests of modern Sumatra and Kalimantan. The Na Duong swamp forest would have also resembled today's peat swamp forests of Indonesia in the height of the forest canopy, estimated at 35 m (115 ft) in height.

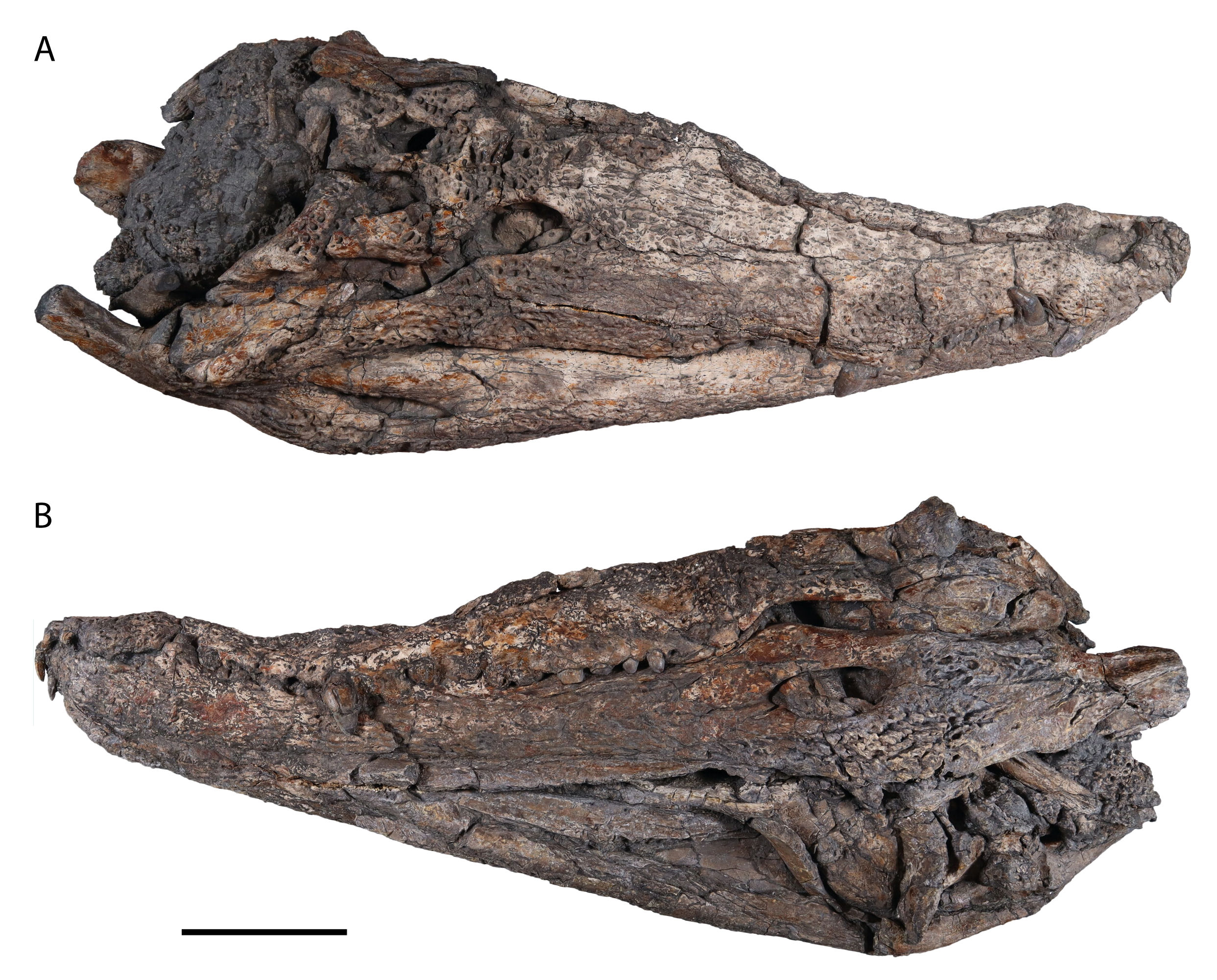
Among the contemporaries of Orientalosuchus was Maomingosuchus acutirostris, a narrow-snouted gavialoid.

In addition to the fossilized tree stumps, the upper parts of the seam also preserve what have been interpreted as deltaic beds containing the leaves of angiosperms and fragments of ferns, with the former preserving a toothed margin that is more characteristic of temperate climates. However, this can be explained with the environment of the formation, with wet conditions favoring leaves with toothed margins and the flora is indeed indicative of a high water table. Plant fossils include leaves similar to those of the legume Bauhinia (which includes several species of lianas) and resin collected is similar to that of Shorea rubriflora, indicating the presence of Dipterocarpaceae. Aquatic plants have been identified from slightly older layers of the Na Duong Formation and include lotus, which would have formed meadows at the same time that shallow ponds were present. Overall the flora superficially resembles that of Lower Oligocene Haselbach, Germany.

The mammal fauna broadly reflects this environmental reconstruction. The basal rhino Epiaceratherium naduongense was an entirely terrestrial animal, but has been interpreted as an obligate browser whose long and slender bones and tapir-like hands fit it being a forest dweller. The forests are also supported by the presence of an early primate, Anthradapis. Other mammals from the formation, the anthracotheres Bakalovia orientalis, Anthracokeryx naduongensis and two species of Bothriogenys are a better match for the often submerged forests and anoxic lake of the Na Duong Basin, given that anthracotheres are often interpreted as semi-aquatic animals similar to modern water buffalos or hippopotamus, though the latter interpretation has been questioned. Fish fossils are common at Na Duong as makes sense given the depositional environment, but are generally disarticulated or isolated. Böhme and colleagues list two families as being present, bowfins and cyprinids, the former primarily found in the same layer as Orientalosuchus and the other more widespread across the lacustrine sediments, though only one is known to co-occur with Orientalosuchus. While the exact bowfin species cannot be determined, fossil remains indicate that they reached a maximum body length of 50 cm (20 in). The carp relative can be narrowed down as far as Barbinae.

=== Paleoecology ===
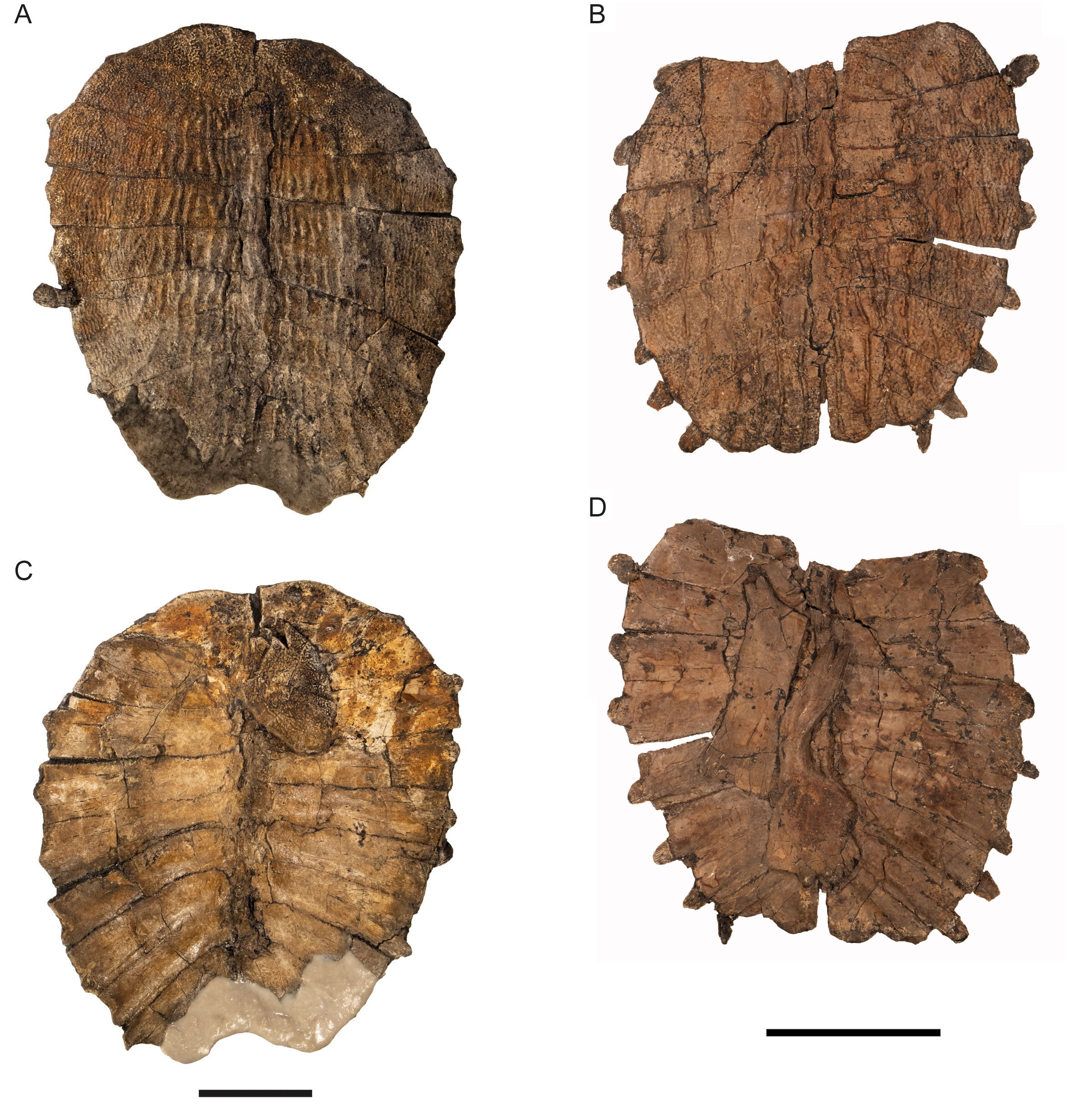
Using its blunt cheek teeth, Orientalosuchus may have been able to crack the shells of turtles such as Striatochelys.

Massonne and colleagues have noted certain similarities in the faunal compositions of various East Asian fossil localities during the Eocene, namely Wai-Lek of the Krabi Province of Thailand, China's Maoming Basin and Vietnam's Na Duong Basin where Orientalosuchus was found. All three localities feature longirostrine species of the genus Maomingosuchus, a type of early gavialoid. The Krabi species remains unnamed, the Maoming Basin was home to Maomingosuchus petrolica and Na Duong yielded the remains of M. acutirostris. All three localities also share the presence of orientalosuchins, Krabisuchus, Dongnanosuchus and Orientalosuchus respectively and similar parallels exist in other reptile groups, specifically pan-geoemydid turtles. In addition to the widespread Maomingosuchus, Böhme and colleagues furthermore mention the presence of a generalist longirostrine taxa similar in appearance to today's Crocodylus or the extinct Asiatosuchus which may have obtained lengths of up to 6 m (20 ft) and possessing heterodont dentition not dissimilar to that of Orientalosuchus. Naturally, the differences in size and skull shape indicate that these animals would have occupied different niches. While Maomingosuchus acutirostris is thought to have been more piscivorous on account of its elongated snout, Orientalosuchus with its broader skull may have been much more of a generalist. At the same time, the robust back teeth of Orientalosuchus may represent adaptations to preying on hard-shelled or armoured prey, such as the local turtles. This finds some support in the clear presence of crocodilian bite marks on fossil carapace recovered from Na Duong. Bite marks are also found on the limb bones of mammals and even some crocodilian skulls, though those were more likely created by the large Crocodylus-like taxon rather than Orientalosuchus.

=== Coprolites and footprints ===
In a 2022 short communication, Kazim Halaclar and colleagues report numerous pieces of fossilized feces, better known as coprolites, from the Na Duong Formation. Particular focus of this report was a crocodilian coprolite bearing two prominent impressions. Analysis of the overall morphology and composition of the coprolite itself confirms it stems from a carnivorous animal and the limited amount of bone fragments suggests that the producer had highly effective stomach acid. Among the fauna known from Na Duong in 2022, this description best suits the local crocodilians. Aspects of the preservation, such as the lack of deformation, can also be explained by the originator having been a semi-aquatic animal, another point in favor of the crocodilian hypothesis, before being rapidly buried by sediment, which can be explained through being positioned at the edge of a river or even seasonal flooding.The impressions are regarded as being too slender to have come from the feet of a squamate, but would be a good fit for the fourth and fifth fingers of a crocodilian, especially given the absence of claw marks of webbing. This also suits the hypothesis that the producer of the coprolite and the track maker were the same animal or at least of the same species. Comparing print size with total body length in modern crocodilians suggests that the track macker was likely around 2 meters long. However, given that it is unknown whether the footprint comes from an adult, it could have also been made by any of the Na Duong crocodilians.
