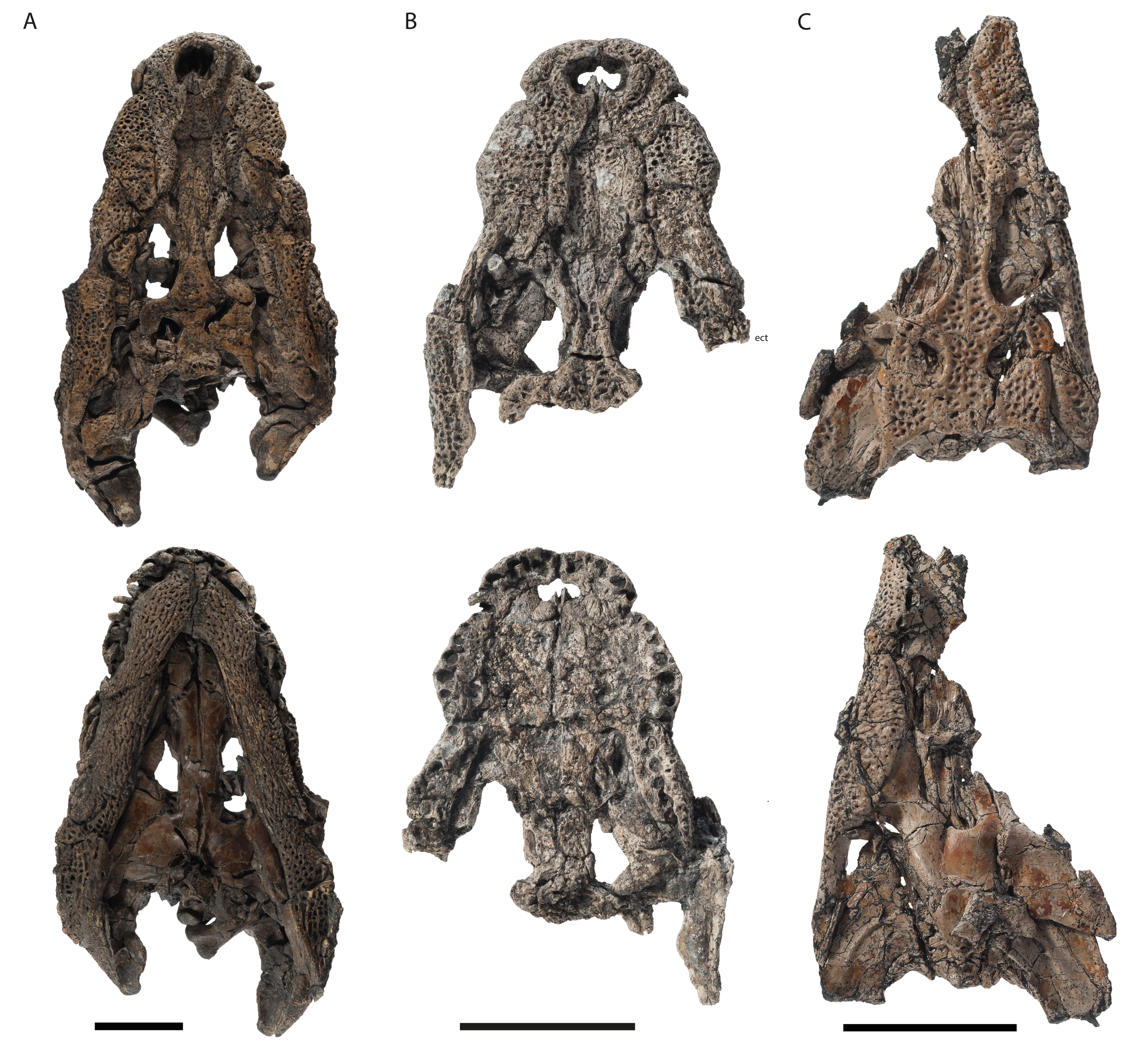
- Various skulls of Orientalosuchus naduongensis

Scientific classification
- Kingdom: Animalia
- Phylum: Chordata
- Class: Reptilia
- Order: Crocodylia
- Superfamily: Alligatoroidea
- Clade: Globidonta
- Clade: †Orientalosuchina; Massonne et al., 2019

Genera
- †Dongnanosuchus; †Eoalligator; †Eurycephalosuchus; †Jiangxisuchus; †Krabisuchus; †Orientalosuchus; †Protoalligator

= Orientalosuchina =

Orientalosuchina Temporal range: Maastrichtian-Eocene, 72–34 Ma

Extinct clade of crocodilians

Orientalosuchina is an extinct clade of alligatoroid crocodylians from Southeast and East Asia that lived from the Maastrichtian to the Eocene. Orientalosuchina are generally small in stature, with even the larger genera being described as "medium-sized" at most and possibly reaching a length of only around 2 m (6 ft 7 in). Members of the clade tend to have blunt, rounded snouts and more bulbous cheek teeth.

Though some members of the group have been known since the mid 20th century, the clade has only been recognized as such in 2019 and even then some authors have disputed the inclusion of certain taxa like Jiangxisuchus and Eoalligator. The exact relationship between orientalosuchins and other crocodylians has likewise been debated. They are conventionally regarded as a basal offshoot of Alligatoroidea, though some researchers have argued that they could be more closely related to crocodyloids or even mekosuchines. This confusion stems in part from the unique mix of anatomical features seen in members of the group, which combine the globular cheek teeth traditionally associated with alligatoroids with partially interlocking dentition as seen in crocodyloids.

The ecology of orientalosuchins has received little attention in literature. While it was once suggested that some of them may have been more terrestrial, it is now generally assumed that orientalosuchins were semi-aquatic. Their posterior teeth may suggest a more durophagous diet and fossils from the Na Duong Basin may be evidence of Orientalosuchus preying on turtles. By the Eocene orientalosuchins are known to have coexisted with the narrow-snouted and likely piscivorous gavialoid Maomingosuchus and at least in some regions with a large generalist crocodilian similar to Asiatosuchus. This suggests that the smaller orientalosuchins filled a different niche from these contemporary species.

== History of discovery ==
While Orientalosuchina have only been recognized as a clade relatively recently, the first discoveries assigned to this clade date back to 1964 when Yang Zhongjian (also known as C.C. Young) discovered crocodilian remains in the Guangdong Province of China. While much of the material discovered by Young was fragmentary, he nevertheless established two species based on it, the crocodyloid Asiatosuchus nanlingensis and the alligatoroid Eoalligator chunyii. Shortly after this discovery more material was uncovered in the Anhui Province, though these fossils would remain undescribed for close to 20 years before Young eventually coined the name Eoalligator huiningensis on the basis of skull remains.

Research on what are now recognized as orientalosuchins would pick up again in the 2010s, beginning with the description of Krabisuchus siamogallicus. The fossil material of Krabisuchus had been collected by the joint efforts of Thai and French paleontologists under Varavudh Suteethorn and Eric Buffetaut during the late 80s and early 90s from lignite pits within the Krabi Basin of Thailand. While preliminary observations had regarded the Krabi material as a species of Allognathosuchus, by 2010 the genus was regarded as a wastebasket taxon with several former species placed in their own genera. Due to this Jeremy E. Martin and Komsorn Lauprasert established the genus Krabisuchus. In 2014, Pavel P. Skutschas and colleagues reported the discovery of another broad-snouted crocodilian, this time from the Maoming Basin of southern China. While the initial findings were too incomplete for a detailed description, the team noted that the fossil appeared to represent an alligatoroid, simply referred to as the "Maoming alligator" at the time.

In 2016, a revision of Eoalligator was published by Yan-Yin Wang, Corwin Sullivan and Jun Liu, who took note of several issues with Young's description of it and Asiatosuchus nanlingensis. The team highlighted that Young did not provide a detailed description for many of the specimen he referred to Eoalligator, nor fully prepared all the fossil material. One of their main points however was that Young never properly distinguished his two taxa, which they argued share some key features in their anatomy. Wang and colleagues came to the conclusion that Eoalligator chunyii was actually a junior synonym of Asiatosuchus nanlingensis while Eoalligator huiningensis should be placed in its own genus which they dubbed Protoalligator. This further had the side effect that the team regarded Eoalligator chunyii to represent a crocodyloid, while Protoalligator remained an alligatoroid. While the distinction between Eoalligator and Protoalligator was readily accepted, Wang eventually contributed to a second study published in 2018 that reinstated Eoalligator as a valid genus after continued study revealed anatomical differences between it and Asiatosuchus nanlingensis.

Two major studies were published in 2019, first among these the description of Jiangxisuchus nankangensis from the Late Cretaceous of China, which was interpreted as a crocodyloid closely related to Eoalligator. The second major study was the description of Orientalosuchus naduongensis, which was based on a plethora of specimen including multiple skulls, lower jaws and even postcranial material, discovered in the late 2000s and early 2010s in the Na Duong Basin in Northeastern Vietnam, close to the border with China. The description of Orientalosuchus allowed Tobias Massonne and colleagues to furthermore establish a monophyletic clade consisting of multiple South-East Asian crocodilians. This clade, which they dubbed Orientalosuchina, was defined as the most inclusive clade to contain to contain Orientalosuchus, Krabisuchus, Jiangxisuchus, Protoalligator and Eoalligator but not Brachychampsa, Stangerochampsa, Bottosaurus, Diplocynodon, Leidyosuchus or any modern crocodilian.

While some subsequent studies would come to question Massonne's interpretation of Orientalosuchina, especially the reported alligatoroid affinities, others would expand on it. In 2021 Hsi-yin Shan and colleagues would describe additional material from the Maoming Basin, allowing them to describe the short-snouted crocodilian from these sediments as Dongnanosuchus hsui. Only a year later a team led by Xiao-Chun Wu described yet another orientalosuchin, the incredibly short snouted Eurycephalosuchus gannanensis from the Maastrichtian Hekou Formation of China.

== Species ==
Genus	Species	Age	Location	Notes	Image
Dongnanosuchus	D. hsui	Eocene	China	Dongnanosuchus is the youngest orientalosuchin from China and known from fossil remains recovered from the oil shale beds of the Maoming Basin (Youganwo Formation).	
Eoalligator	E. chunyii	Maastrichtian - Paleocene	China	Eoalligator was the first orientalosuchin to be named, having been described by Yang Zhongjian in 1964. Fossils have been recovered from the Late Cretaceous Zhenshui Formation as well as the Paleocene Shanghu Formation, suggesting that Eoalligator survived the meteor impact that was responsible for the extinction of the dinosaurs. Eoalligator was once thought to be synonymous with Asiatosuchus nanlingensis, but research has since then rejected this hypothesis.	
Eurycephalosuchus	E. gannanensis	Maastrichtian	China	Eurycephalosuchus from the Late Cretaceous Hekou Formation is regarded as one of the most unusually proportioned orientalosuchins. While most members of the clade have a snout described as short and blunt, that of Eurycephalosuchus is extreme even by these standards. It is also possibly the smallest member of Orientalosuchina.	
Jiangxisuchus	J. nankangensis	Maastrichtian	China	Jiangxisuchus is among the more debated members of Orientalosuchina, having originally been classified as a crocodyloid closely related to Eoalligator. Some subsequent research has continued to argue for it being more closely related to modern crocodiles than to alligators, but even studies placing it within Orientalosuchina generally do so as a close relative to Eoalligator. Fossils of Jiangxisuchus were initially described to have come from the Late Cretaceous Nanxiong Formation, though later papers have attributed the specific sediments to the Hekou Formation.	
Krabisuchus	K. siamogallicus	Eocene (Priabonian)	Thailand	Krabisuchus is exclusively known from the Krabi Basin of southern Thailand, where it lived during the latest Eocene. It was initially interpreted as a relative of Allognathosuchus before being placed in the clade Orientalosuchina.	
Orientalosuchus	O. naduongensis	Eocene (Late Bartonian - Priabonian)	Vietnam	Orientalosuchus is the namesake of the clade Orientalosuchina and was described in 2019 from several specimen recovered from the Na Duong Basin of northern Vietnam. Due to its broad skull and blunt posterior teeth, it has been interpreted as a generalist whose diet might have included turtles.	
Protoalligator	P. huiningensis	Middle Paleocene	China	Protoalligator was originally named Eoalligator huiningensis, but moved to its own genus in 2016 after Eoalligator was briefly synonymized with the crocodyloid Asiatosuchus nanlingensis. Since Protoalligator was still regarded as an alligatoroid, its name was specifically chosen to carry on the meaning of Eoalligator, though now both are considered to be valid species and potential relatives. The fossils are known from the Paleocene Wanghudun Formation.	

== Description ==
Orientalosuchins were small crocodilians with short snouts, though there was some variation in the specific morphotypes displayed by members of this group. Some taxa, such as Jiangxisuchus and Dongnanosuchus, are described as more platyrostral, emphasizing the fact that their snouts like those of many modern crocodilians were flattened. Others like Orientalosuchus and Krabisuchus meanwhile tend to be described as brevirostral, highlighting the proportional shortness of their snouts. Krabisuchus in particular is noted for appearing to have had a wedge-shaped head similar to that of Hassiacosuchus, described as altirostral by Martin and Lauprasert. The most extreme case of brevirostry is seen in Eurycephalosuchus, literally named for its unusual proportions. The skull of Eurycephalosuchus is nearly as wide as it is long and even the skull table is described as "abnormally" short.

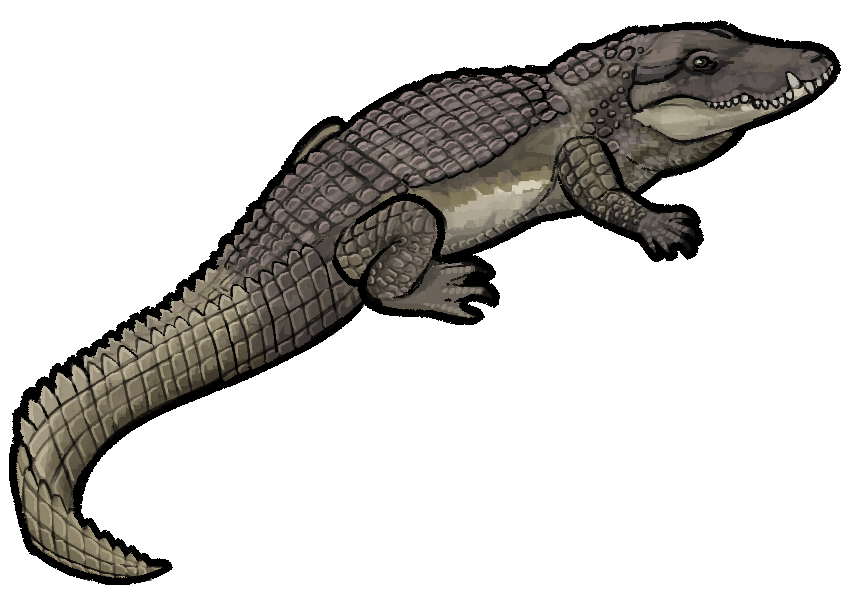
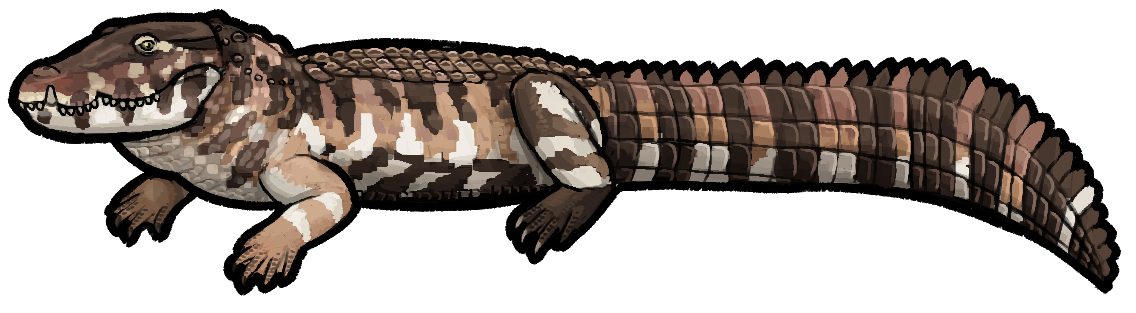
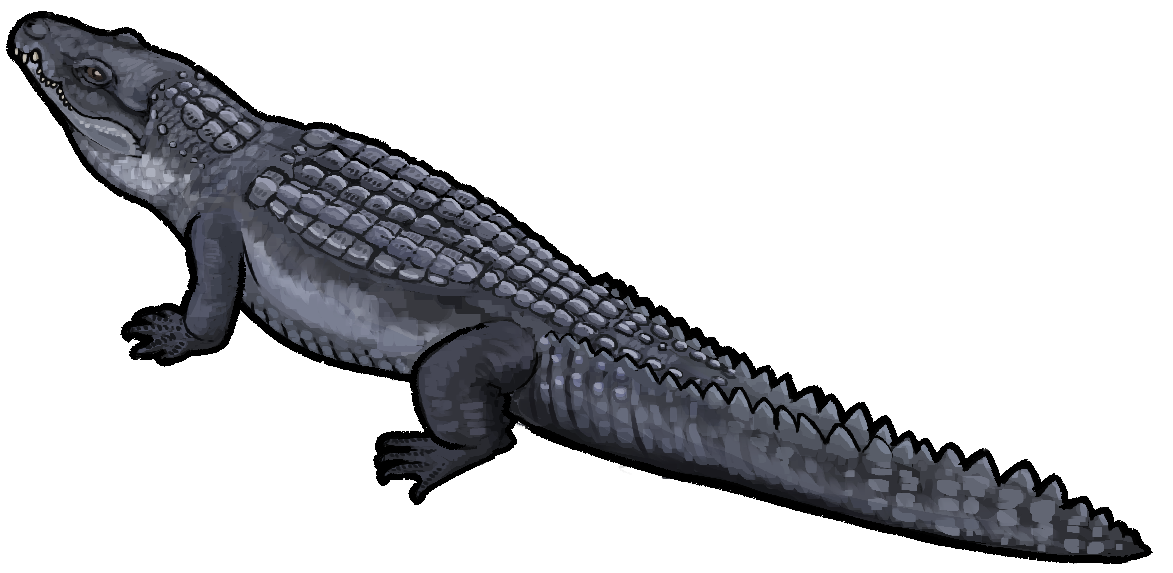
Artistic interpretations of Jiangxisuchus, Orientalosuchus and Dongnanosuchus.

Orientalosuchins have been described as displaying a mix of features traditionally associated with either crocodyloids or alligatoroids, contributing to the uncertainties surrounding their classification. For example, several forms in this clade, such as Orientalosuchus, Dongnanosuchus, Krabisuchus and Eurycephalosuchus, possess a notch situated at the contact between the premaxilla and the maxilla. This notch, which receives the enlarged fourth dentary tooth, is typically associated with modern crocodyloids and not seen in alligators. The exact shape and size of the notch can vary and is described as more of a fossa or pit in Eoalligator, while in Dongnanosuchus the notch itself contains a pit in its roof. In both cases this causes the fourth dentary to be at least partially obscured when the jaws were closed rather than fully exposed. In Krabisuchus the notch is fully formed, but it has been speculated that the fourth dentary tooth might have slid into a medial pit regardless.

This resemblance to crocodyloids is contrasted by the heterodont dentition of several forms which features globular teeth in the back of the jaw, a trait that is otherwise regarded as characteristic for alligatoroids within the clade Globidonta. Orientalosuchus for example had pointed anterior teeth that eventually transition into blunt, conical cheek teeth, though they are not as globular as in animals like Hassiacosuchus. Blunt to bulbous posterior teeth are also known from Krabisuchus and Protoalligator and those of Jiangxisuchus are described as having had a constricted base and bean-shaped crowns.

The way the teeth of the upper and lower jaw interact on the other hand represents a third state in some species, this time intermediate to the crocodyloid and alligatoroid conditions, as Chabrol and colleagues describe them as "partially interlocking" in Orientalosuchus, Dongnanosuchus, Eurycephalosuchus and Jiangxisuchus. They contrast this with what is seen in members of Longirostres, which have fully interlocking maxillary and dentary teeth, and alligatoroids as well as Krabisuchus, well known for their pronounced overbite.

Another notable feature is the presence of an enlarged fifth caniniform maxillary tooth, specifically that this tooth is the largest of the maxillary teeth. This is another plesiomorphic feature and contrasts with derived members of Alligatoridae, in which the fourth maxillary tooth is larger. This tooth is especially large in Eurycephalosuchus.

=== Size ===
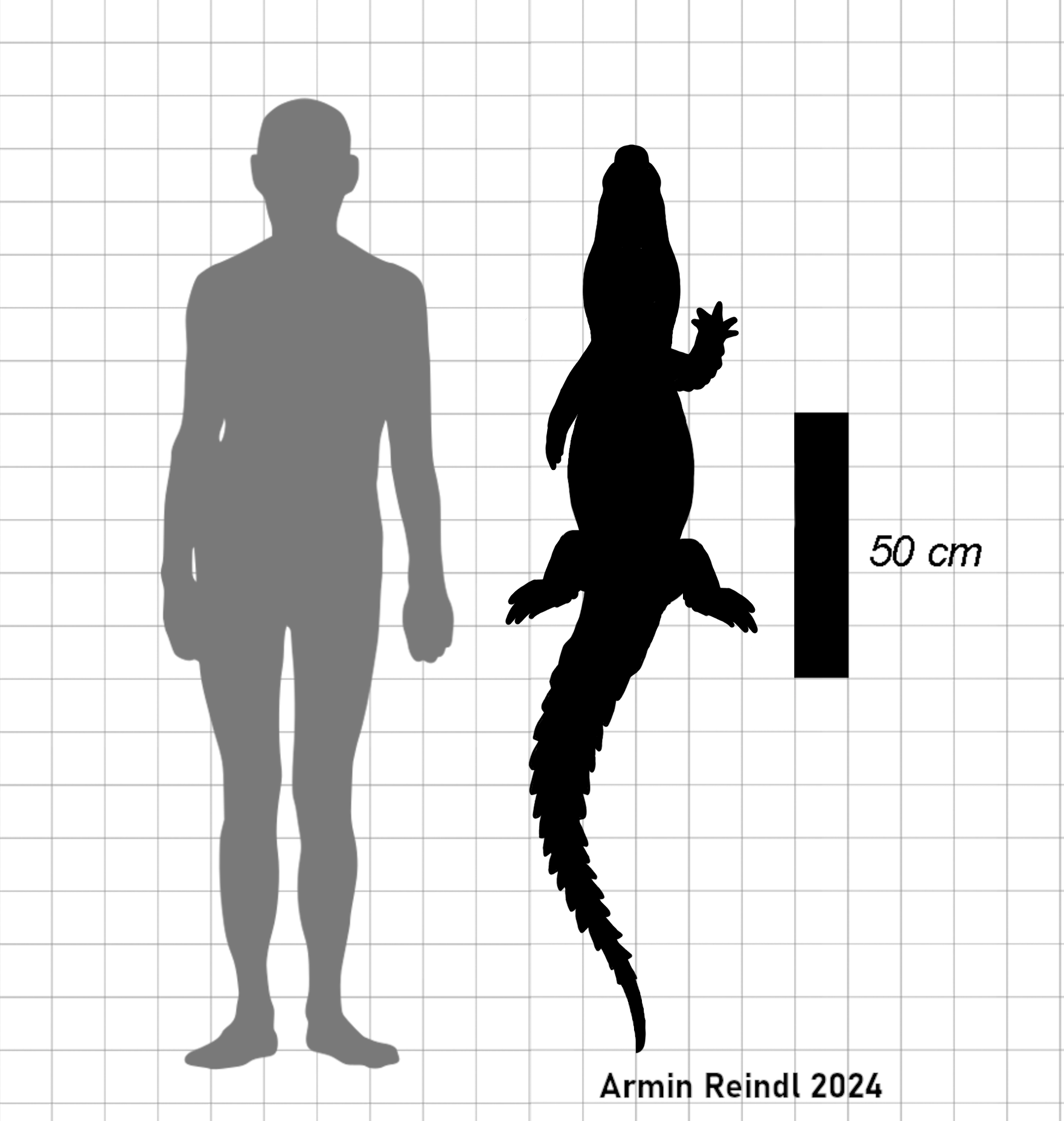
Orientalosuchins were small animals, with even larger species likely not exceeding 2 meters in length.

Orientalosuchins are generally small by crocodilian standards, though few papers provide precise body length estimates. One such estimate comes from Madelaine Böhme and colleagues, who suggest that Orientalosuchus (at that time only identified as an "Alligator-shaped species") could have reached a length of up to 2 m (6 ft 7 in). A similar range appears to have been reached by some other orientalosuchins as well. Shan and colleagues describe Dongnanosuchus as "small to medium-sized" and specifically compare its dimensions to those of Orientalosuchus and Jiangxisuchus. Accordingly, specimens of Dongnanosuchus suggest a skull length of just over 20 cm (7.9 in) and a skull width across the quadratojugals just under 13 cm (5.1 in), while in Orientalosuchus the skull appears to be just under 20 cm (7.9 in) long but slightly wider. The skull length of Jiangxisuchus is similarly just under 20 cm (7.9 in) with the body-size variably described of "small-sized" or "small to medium-sized" within the same study. In addition to these general comparisons, the introduction to Tobias Massonne's dissertation "The Crocodylian, Bird and Turtle Fauna from the Late Eocene Na Duong Basin of Vietnam" (which also included the type description of Orientalosuchus) provides a rough scaling of several select Asian crocodilians, among them Dongnanosuchus. This figure suggests a total length of around 1.5 m (4 ft 11 in) for the animal.

Even less has been stated on the size of Eoalligator and Protoalligator, with the former simply being stated to have been "median-sized" by Wu and colleagues in 2018 and "of moderate size" by Young in 1964. The latter is depicted as being approximately 2 m (6 ft 7 in) long in the disseration of Tobias Massonne.

The size of Krabisuchus is also kept rather vague in its type description, with Martin and Lauprasert simply stating that it likely didn't grow larger than 2 m (6 ft 7 in). However, two sources provide additional information on the potential size of Krabisuchus. In the 2022 description of Eurycephalosuchus, the Chinese taxon is stated to possibly represent the smallest orientalosuchin and that its skull length is only slightly shorter than that of Krabisuchus. The same study also compares Eurycephalosuchus to Eoalligator, again noting that the former was smaller than the latter when comparing the width of the occiput. Secondly, the introduction to Tobias Massonne's disseration also provides rough estimates for Krabisuchus, suggesting that the animal may have reached a total body length of only 1 m (3 ft 3 in). This in turn suggests Eurycephalosuchus would have been even smaller.

== Phylogeny ==
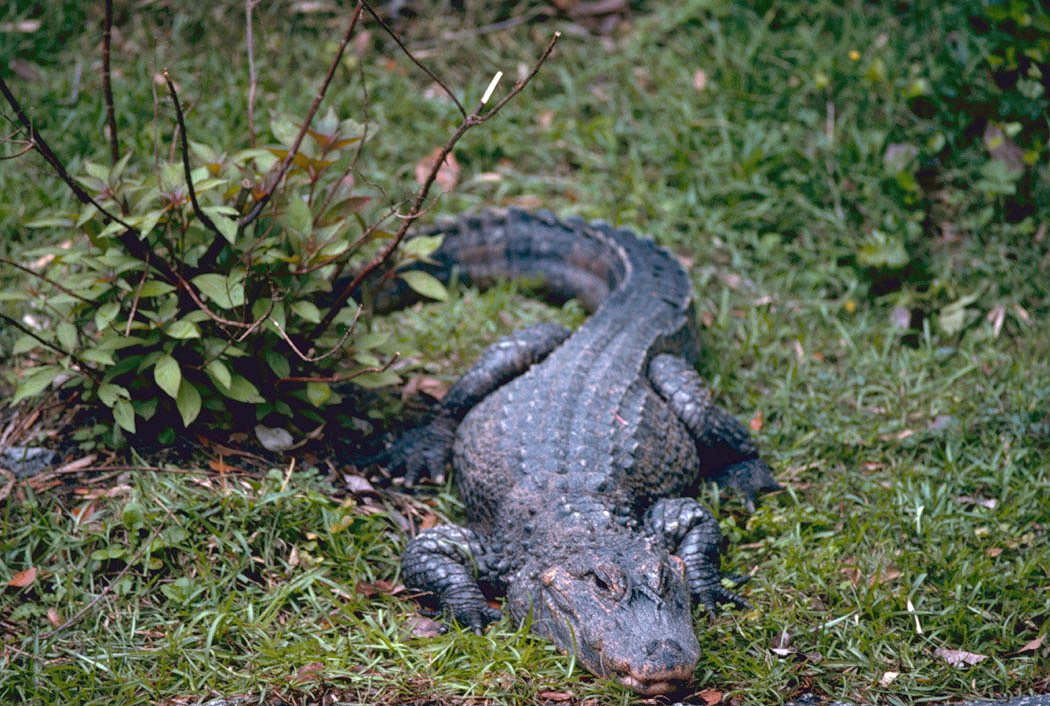
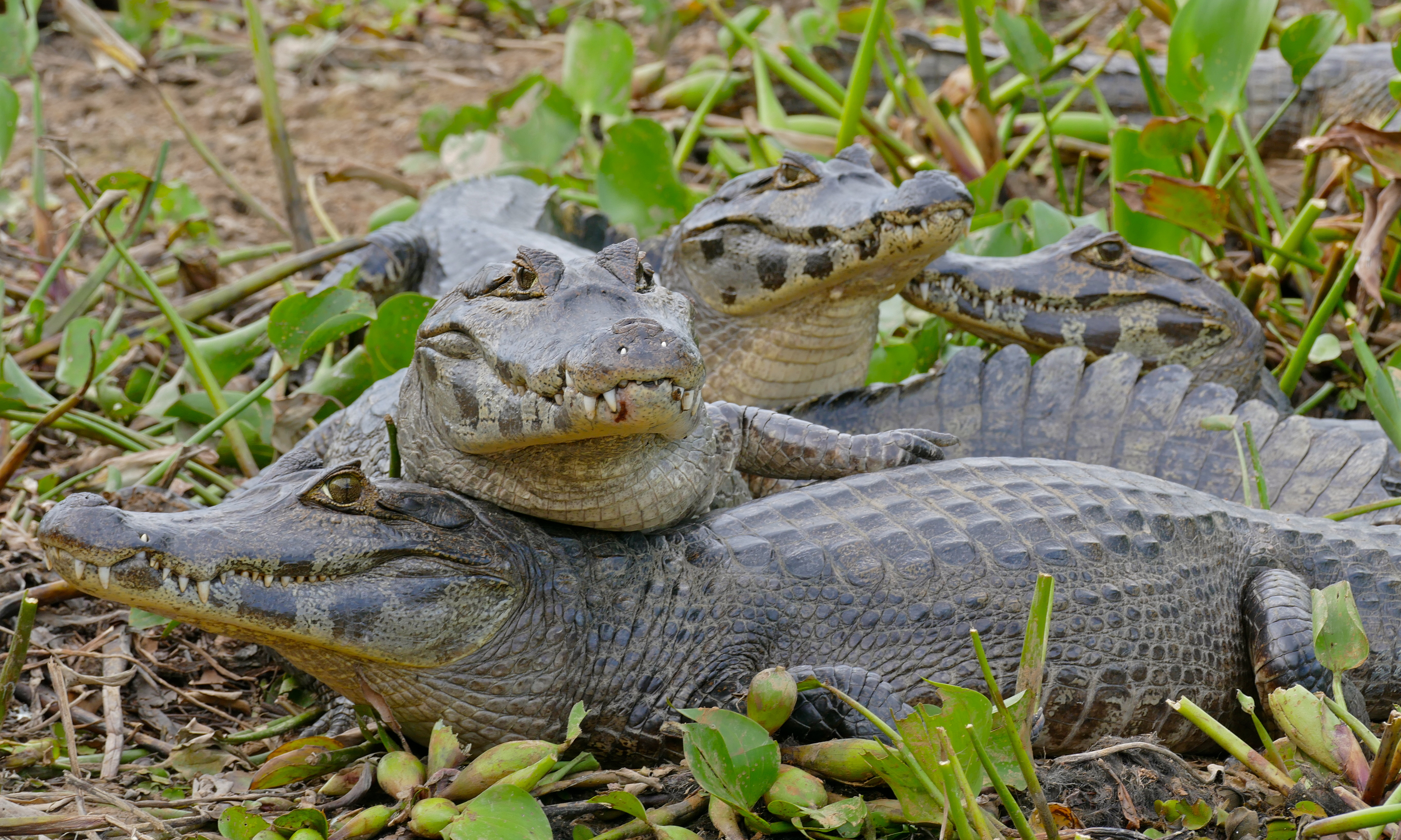
Orientalosuchins are traditionally regarded as alligatoroids, the clade that includes modern alligators (top) and caimans (bottom).

=== External relationships ===
The precise relationship between orientalosuchins and other crocodilians is a disputed subject with several different interpretations of how they would fit into the group. Traditionally, orientalosuchins have been interpreted as part of the Alligatoroidea clade, most commonly thought to consist of some basal taxa like Deinosuchus and Diplocynodon as well as the derived alligatorids, which are split into Alligatorinae and Caimaninae. Even prior to the recognition of Orientalosuchina as a clade, several members included in this group were thought to be closely related to alligatorids. For instance, Eoalligator, as the name would suggest, was originally classified as an alligatoroid, as was Protoalligator (formerly a species of Eoalligator). Similarly, Dongnanosuchus was initially known as the "Maoming alligator" and early phylogenies featuring Krabisuchus generally regarded the taxon as having a possible connection to the early alligatoroid Allognathosuchus among others.

These largely separate results would eventually be used by Tobias Massonne and colleagues to erect the clade Orientalosuchina, which the team recovered as the earliest branch of Globidonta. Following this interpretation, orientalosuchins would have split from the alligatoroid lineage after taxa such as Deinosuchus, Leidyosuchus and Diplocynodon but before the split into caimans and alligators. This hypothesis is notably favored by studies following Massonne in recovering a monophyletic Orientalosuchina, such as Shan et al. (2021) and Wu et al. (2022). A similar topology was also recovered by Jules D. Walter and colleagues in 2025, with the only major difference being that their study argued that Deinosuchus, Leidyosuchus and Diplocynodon are all non-crocodilians, therefore rendering Globidonta redundant and leaving Orientalosuchina as the basalmost branch of Alligatoroidea. However, the team notes that the position of Orientalosuchina is an unstable one and not well supported.

Shown below are the phylogenetic results of Shan et al. (2021) as well as Walter et al. (2025).

- Crocodylia
  - Gavialoidea
  - - †Borealosuchus
    - - †Planocraniidae
      - Brevirostres
        - Crocodyloidea
        - Alligatoroidea
          - †Leidyosuchus
          - - †Diplocynodon
            - - †Deinosuchus
              - Globidonta
                - †Orientalosuchina
                - Alligatoridae
                  - Alligatorinae
                  - Caimaninae

- - - †Borealosuchus
    - †Diplocynodon
  - - †Leidyosuchus
    - - †Deinosuchus
      - - †Planocraniidae
        - Crocodilia
          - Longirostres (including Crocodyloidea and Gavialoidea)
          - Alligatoroidea
            - †Orientalosuchina
            - - Alligatorinae
              - Caimaninae

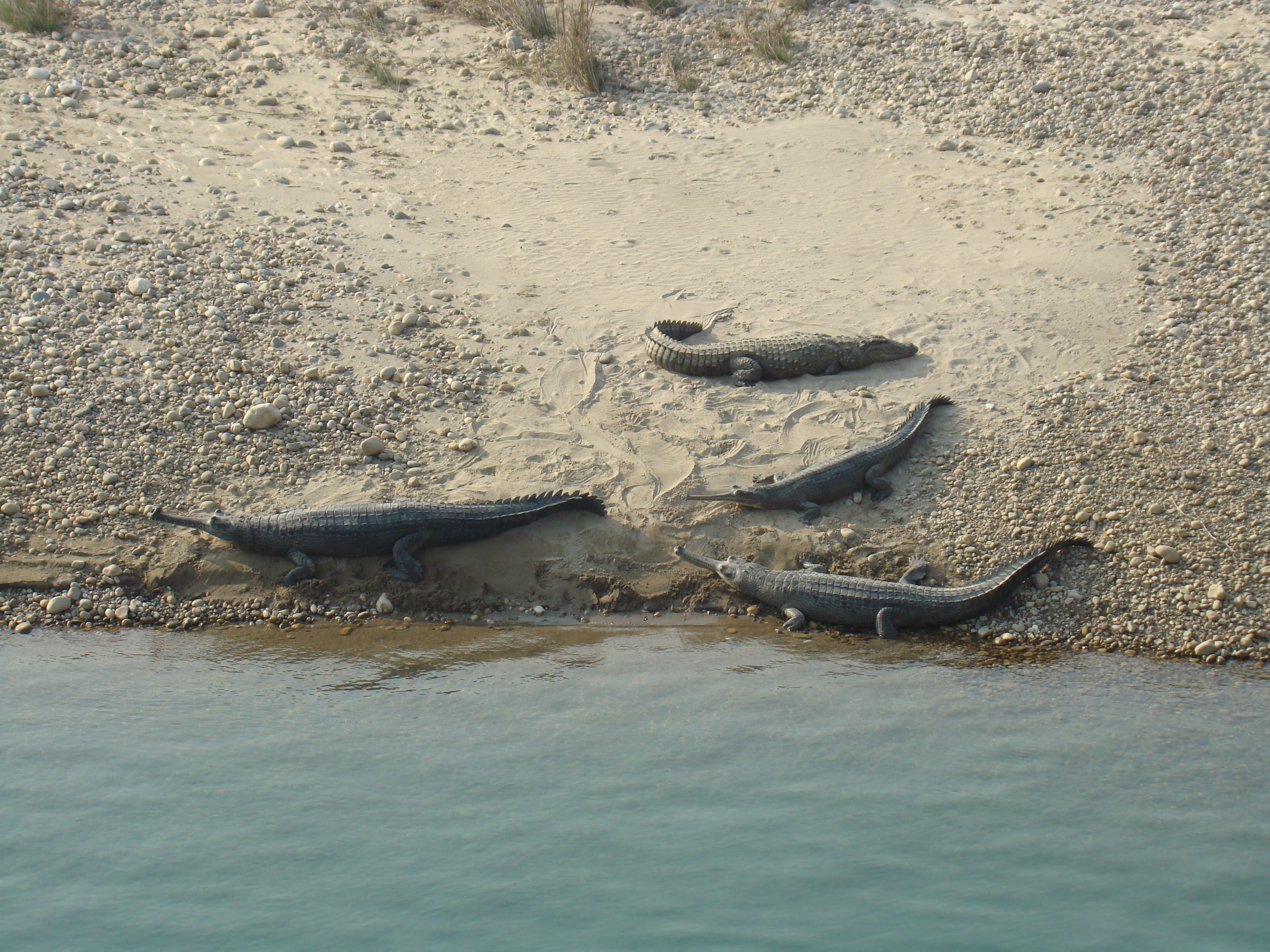
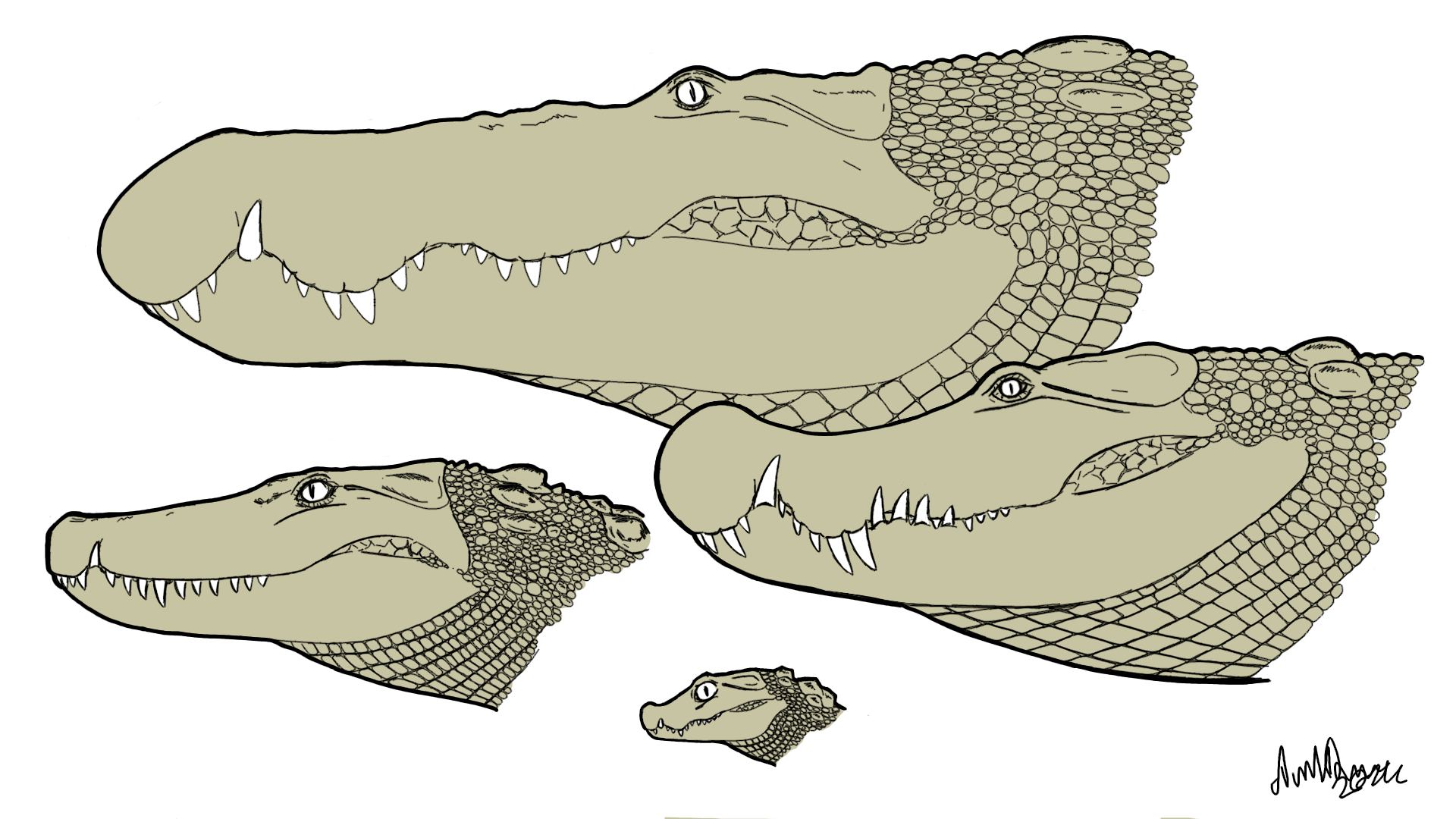
Some recent works have come to question the alligatoroid affinities of orientalosuchins, instead suggesting a link to the clade Longirostres (crocodiles and gharials, top) and possibly even mekosuchines (bottom) in particular.

A similar objection to that of Walter et al. has been raised by Nils Chabrol and colleagues in 2024, who note the conflicting anatomical features of orientalosuchins. In this study two different results were recovered, with Orientalosuchina generally being less inclusive than established by Massonne. The result that recovers a select few orientalosuchins as closer to alligators, achieved through implied weighting of phylogenetic characters, has them form a clade at the base of Alligatoroidea. Both analysis feature Protoalligator as an unrelated alligatoroid. Under equal weighting of characters, the results suggest a closer relationship with Longirostres, the clade formed by crocodyloids and gavialoids, with Orientalosuchina splitting off before these two clades diverged from one-another. Much like how Protoalligator was found as an alligatoroid regardless of the used method, both results find Jiangxisuchus to be a member of Longirostres independent of Orientalosuchina. The reason for these strongly conflicting results is the mosaic of anatomical features seen in members of Orientalosuchina. For instance, many members of the clade possess bulbous, globular teeth towards the back of the jaw, a feature associated with early alligatoroids (hence the clade name Globidonta). However, several orientalosuchins also feature a prominent notch between the premaxilla and maxilla which receives the enlarged fourth dentary tooth, a feature not seen in modern alligators but still well developed in crocodylids. The way the teeth interlock on the other hand strikes a middle ground between the two clades, not forming the same overbite as observed in most alligatoroids but also not fully interlocking as is traditional for Longirostres. Chabrol and colleagues argue that this mix of characters could be tied to the early divergence of orientalosuchins, having split off before some of these features became ingrained in their respective lineages.

- - Longirostres
  - - - - †Qianshanosuchus
        - †Asiatosuchus depressifrons
      - - †Crocodylus affinis
        - †Asiatosuchus germanicus
    - - †Planocraniidae
      - Alligatoroidea
        - †Orientalosuchina
        - other alligatoroids

- - †Planocraniidae
  - - †Asiatosuchus germanicus
    - - - †Asiatosuchus depressifrons
        - †Crocodylus affinis
      - - †Qianshanosuchus
        - - †Jiangxisuchus
          - - †Quinkana
            - - †Australosuchus
              - - †Orientalosuchina
                - - Gavialoidea
                  - Crocodyloidea

The results of Chabrol and colleagues in part reflect previous results concerning Jiangxisuchus. While most orientalosuchins had been regarded as alligatoroids prior to the clade being named, Jiangxisuchus was initially described as a crocodyloid, a placement also recovered in 2021. Eoalligator, though initially described as an alligatoroid, has also been frequently recovered as a crocodyloid. This includes as a synonym of Asiatosuchus nanlingensis in 2016, as part of a large polytomy in 2018 and as the sister taxon to Jiangxisuchus in 2019. However, in all those cases the two taxa are isolated from other orientalosuchins, rather than shifting the entire group's position within Crocodilia.

A hypothesis that would place Orientalosuchina as a whole outside of Alligatoroidea has been proposed by Jorgo Ristevski and colleagues in a 2023, with some of their results suggesting that orientalosuchins could have been part of the clade Mekosuchinae. While most of their phylogenies recover mekosuchines and orientalosuchins as being unrelated to one-another, two trees find orientalosuchins to be deeply nested within Mekosuchinae. More specifically, these two trees show orientalosuchins to be closely related to dwarf forms like Trilophosuchus and Mekosuchus, whereas large-bodied mekosuchines like Baru and Paludirex are more basal. Within the broader context of Crocodilia, this would suggest that orientalosuchins are actually part of an early off-shoot of the branch that includes Longirostres. However, even in this study the position of Orientalosuchina is not without doubt. For one this topology was only recovered in two out of eight analyses, with the remaining six all suggesting more traditional topologies. Furthermore, the features that could be used to argue for a close relationship between mekosuchines and orientalosuchins are either not present in all genera within their respective clades or more widespread across crocodilia.

- Crocodylia
  - Alligatoroidea
  - - †Planocraniidae†
    - - - †Asiatosuchus germanicus†
        - †Mekosuchinae (including Orientalosuchina)†
      - - †Prodiplocynodon†
        - - - †"Crocodylus" affinis†
            - †"Crocodylus" depressifrons†
          - - †"Crocodylus" acer†
            - †Brachyuranochampsa†
          - Longirostres
            - Gavialoidea
            - Crocodyloidea

- Mekosuchinae
  - - †Kalthifrons
    - - - †Quinkana meboldi
        - - †Quinkana fortirostrum
          - †Quinkana timara
      - - - †Paludirex gracilis
          - †Paludirex vincenti
        - - †Baru wickeni
          - †Baru darrowi
  - - Orientalosuchina
      - †Krabisuchus
      - - †Orientalosuchus
        - - †Jiangxisuchus
          - †Eoalligator
    - - †Dongnanosuchus
      - - †"Baru" huberi
        - - †Volia
          - †Trilophosuchus
          - - †Mekosuchus sanderi
            - †Mekosuchus whitehunterensis
            - †Mekosuchus inexpectatus

=== Internal relationships ===
When Orientalosuchina was described in 2019 it was specifically defined based on the inclusion of five species: Orientalosuchus naduongensis, Krabisuchus siamogallicus, Eoalligator chunyii, Jiangxisuchus nankangensis and Protoalligator huiningensis. However, the internal topology of this clade was initially poorly resolved, with most of these species being placed in a large polytomy and only Orientalosuchus and Krabisuchus being found to have a closer relationship to each other than to other orientalosuchins. Additional research in subsequent years also saw the description and inclusion of Dongnanosuchus hsui and Eurycephalosuchus gannanensis within Orientalosuchina. In both instances, the authors maintained the monophyly of the group, continuing to include all five of Massonne's defining species within the clade, but with a better resolved internal relationships. Both studies place Krabisuchus as the earliest diverging orientalosuchin, followed by Protoalligator as the next basalmost genus within the clade. In both studies Jiangxisuchus and Eoalligator are sister taxa. The close relationship between the two animals from Cretaceous China has previously also been found by Li and colleagues in 2019, though in said case they were regarded as crocodyloids. Orientalosuchus, Dongnanosuchus and Eurycephalosuchus are all part of a polytomy that further includes the Jiangxisuchus - Eoalligator clade following the results of Wu et al. (2022). Walter and colleagues present another alternative, finding Protoalligator as the basalmost genus in place of Krabisuchus, lending further support for the Jiangxisuchus - Eoalligator clade and recovering Dongnanosuchus as the sister taxon to Krabisuchus and Orientalosuchus.

- Orientalosuchina
  - †Krabisuchus siamogallicus
  - - †Protoalligator huiningensis
    - - †Orientalosuchus naduongenis
      - †Dongnanosuchus hsui
      - †Eurycephalosuchus gannanensis
      - - †Jiangxisuchus nankangensis
        - †Eoalligator chunyii

- Orientalosuchina
  - †Protoalligator huiningensis
  - - - †Jiangxisuchus nankangensis
      - †Eoalligator chunyii
    - - †Dongnanosuchus hsui
      - - †Orientalosuchus naduongenis
        - †Krabisuchus siamogallicus

While originally defined around the presence of five specific taxa, some later studies could only recover significantly less inclusive versions of the clade. In the study that recovered Orientalosuchina within Mekosuchinae, the core monophyletic group is only formed by Orientalosuchus, Krabisuchus, Jiangxisuchus and Eoalligator, with the latter two once again each other's closest relatives. Protoalligator was recovered as part of a polytomy at the base of Crocodilia and though Dongnanosuchus was still closely allied with orientalosuchins in the study, it was found to be phylogenetically closer to small-bodied mekosuchines, splitting off after the divergence of the other traditional forms. Chabrol and colleagues were likewise unable to place all members originally used in the definition of Orientalosuchina within a monophyletic group. Both in the scenario that orientalosuchins were alligatoroids and the scenario that they were closer to Longirostres, the group was found to consist of only Orientalosuchus, Dongnanosuchus, Krabisuchus and Eurycephalosuchus. In both scenarios Dongnanosuchus and Orientalosuchus were found to be sister taxa, with the key difference being whether Krabisuchus and Eurycephalosuchus formed their own clade or were successively branching species of the clade.

Ristevski et al. (2023)

- †Mekosuchinae
  - - †Kalthifrons
    - - †Quinkana
      - - †Paludirex
        - †Baru
  - - Orientalosuchina
      - †Krabisuchus
      - - †Orientalosuchus
        - - †Jiangxisuchus
          - †Eoalligator
    - - †Dongnanosuchus
      - - †"Baru" huberi
        - - †Volia
          - †Trilophosuchus
          - †Mekosuchus

Chabrol et al. (2024) (implied weighting)

- - †Planocraniidae
  - Alligatoroidea
    - - †Eurycephalosuchus gannanensis
      - - †Krabisuchus siamogallicus
        - - †Orientalosuchus naduongenis
          - †Dongnanosuchus hsui
    - other alligatoroids

Chabrol et al. (2024) (equal weighting)

- Longirostres
  - - - †Eurycephalosuchus gannanensis
      - †Krabisuchus siamogallicus
    - - †Orientalosuchus naduongenis
      - †Dongnanosuchus hsui
  - - Crocodyloidea
    - Gavialoidea

== Origins and dispersal ==
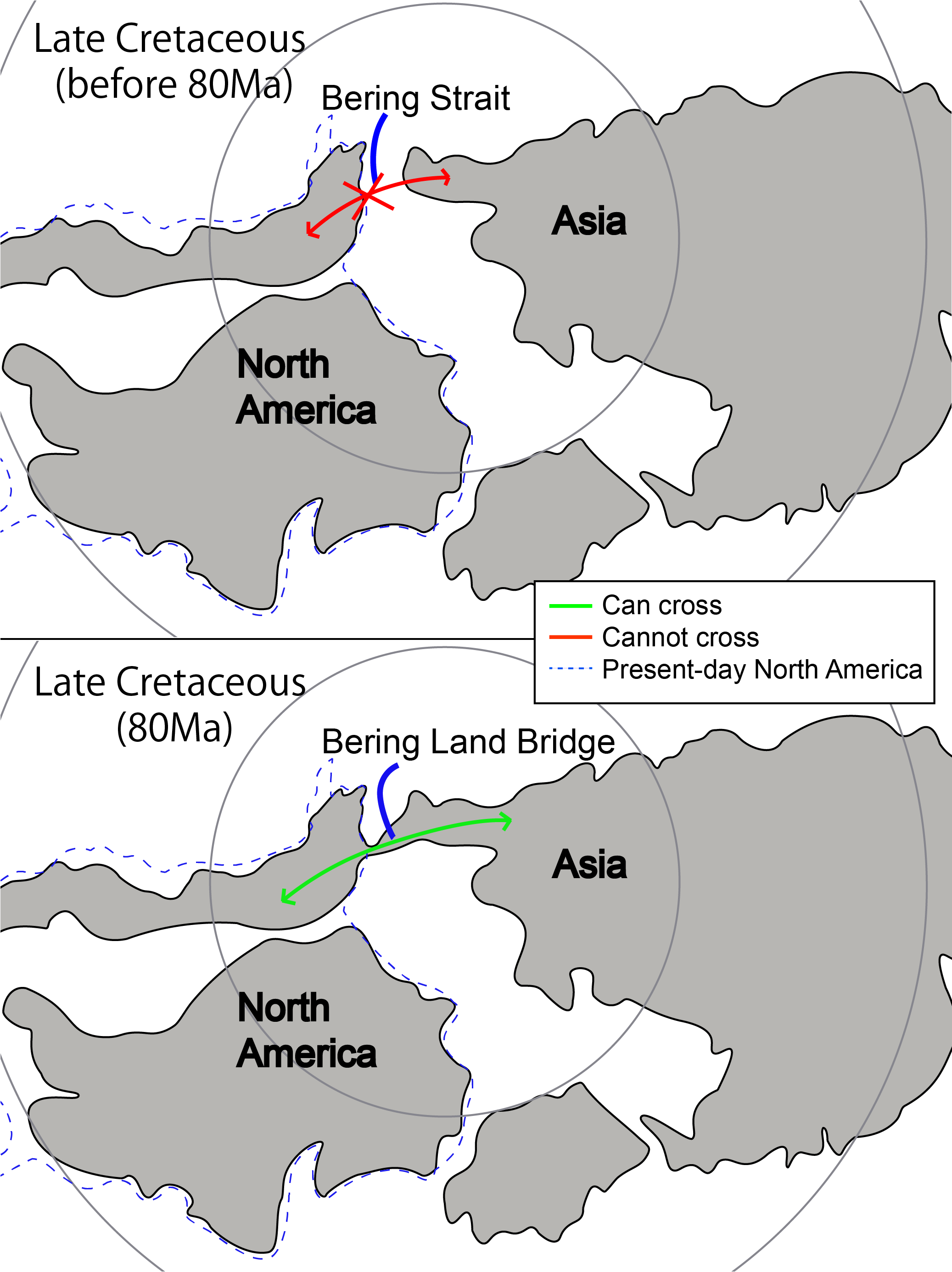
It has been suggested that orientalosuchins derive from alligatoroids that crossed into Asia during the Cretaceous. Assuming that they lacked salt glands like modern alligators, this would have likely happened via the Bering land bridge.

One aspect of Orientalosuchina that has remained a matter of discussion is their evolutionary origin, especially in regards to their distribution when regarded as alligatoroids. All members of this clade are exclusively known from Southeast and East Asia, with especially their early evolution centered around the eastern part of China. This stands in stark contrast to the fact that alligatoroids are a primarily American clade that rarely ventured beyond that continent, with the few exceptions including the lineage leading up to today's Chinese alligator (Alligator sinensis) and the Paleogene genus Diplocynodon from Europe, though the latter has also been interpreted as a stem-crocodilian instead.

While orientalosuchins inhabited a similar geographic regions to today's Chinese alligator and its fossil relatives, their dispersals into Asia are understood to have been entirely unrelated from the latter. Modern Chinese alligators are a lot closer to American alligators and likely split from them fairly recently, possibly within the last 20 million years, with fossils dating to the Pleistocene and possibly Pliocene. Other potential relatives of this lineage include the poorly understood Miocene Alligator luicus and the Pleistocene Alligator munensis. Regardless of the origins of the more recent Asian members of Alligator, the origins of orientalosuchins clearly date back much further. The oldest members of this group come from the latest Cretaceous of China, suggesting a minimum Maastrichtian age for their last common ancestor. Massonne and colleagues specifically hypothesize that the ancestor of orientalosuchins may have been part of a poorly understood faunal exchange between North America and Asia that also saw the dispersal of hadrosaurs, tyrannosaurs and ceratopsians into the latter. An even earlier point of origin has been proposed by Shan and colleagues, who go as far as placing the origin of Orientalosuchina in the Campanian, around the same time that other early alligatoroids such as Brachychampsa first appeared and spread across North America.

Whether or not the group dates to the Campanian or Maaastrichtian, it is considered most likely that their ancestors entered Asia through a land bridge formed by what is now Beringia, which according to Massonne and colleagues would have furthermore profited from the lower eustatic sea levels of the Maastrichtian. Alternatively to the dispersal via Beringia, it has been proposed that orientalosuchins could have plausibly arrived in Asia not directly from America but through Europe, justified through the presence of the putative stem-alligatoroids like Diplocynodon in Paleogene Europe. However, this hypothesis was proposed specifically to explain the distribution of some Paleogene forms and predates the concept of Orientalosuchina, meaning it does not consider subsequent Cretaceous records. Both routes suggest a terrestrial dispersal for Orientalosuchina, which ties into the fact that unlike crocodyloids and gavialoids, alligatoroids are presumed to have lost their salt glands early in their evolution, greatly restricting their ability to traverse saltwater.

The closest thing to evidence for North American orientalosuchins might be specimen UCMP 164865, an alligatoroid of uncertain placement discovered in the Hancock Mammal Quarry of the Eocene Clarno Formation. The animal, which has not been named, shares several features with various orientalosuchins and has been noted for its unique geographic position relative to other Paleogene alligatoroids from North America. While alligatoroids were at that point common east and south of the Rocky Mountains, the Claro Formation crops out west of the Rockies in the state of Oregon and preserves both fauna and flora that are more similar to contemporary Asian sites. Due to this, Stout and colleagues regard the idea of orientalosuchins having emigrated back to North America by the Eocene or even had a generally wider distribution as at least possible. However, the exact placement of the Clarno Formation alligatoroid remains unclear.

== Paleoecology ==
=== Diet ===
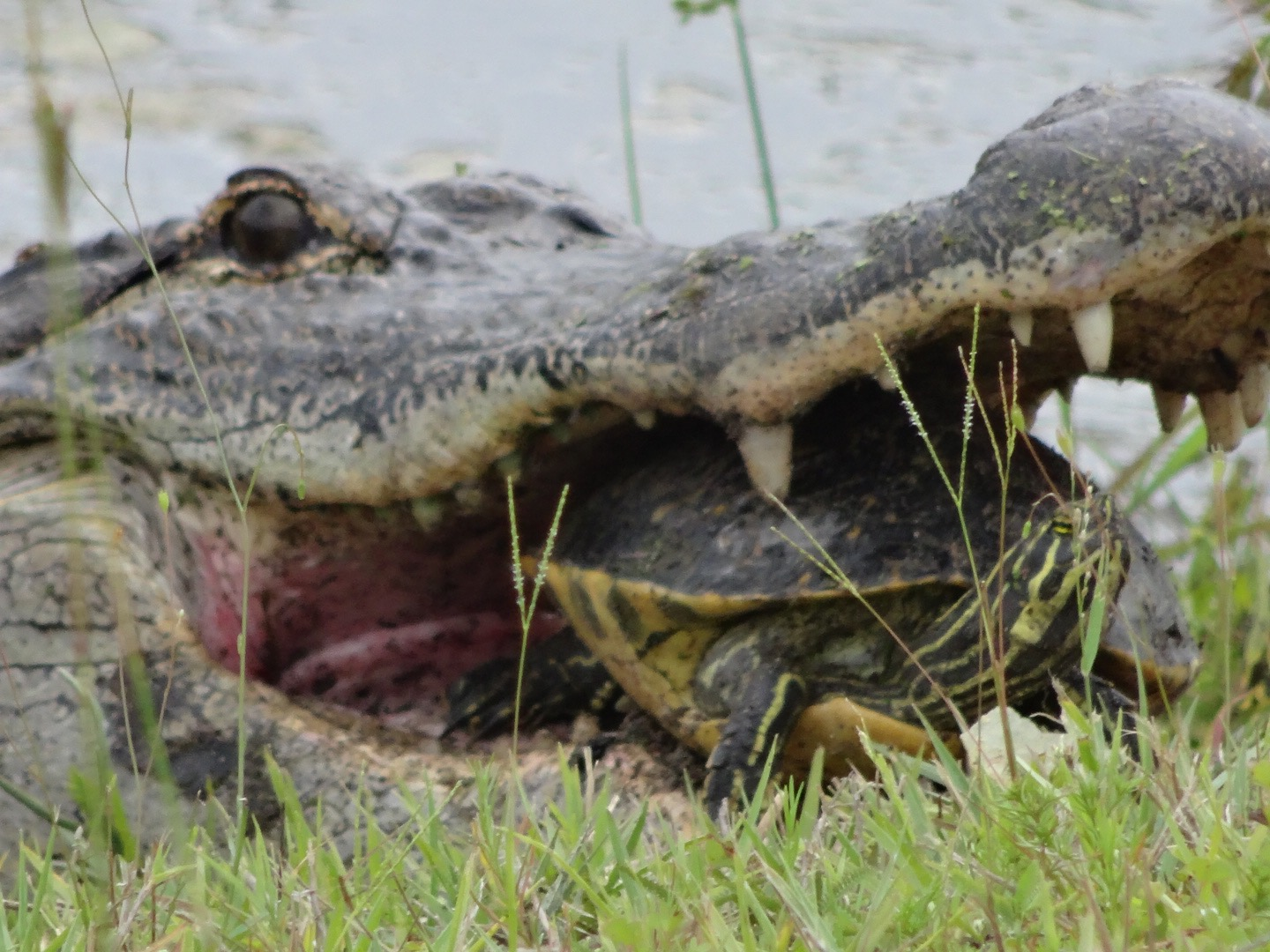
Like some modern crocodilians, Orientalosuchus may have been able to crush the shells of turtles.

Relatively little has been published on the ecology of orientalosuchins, with only occasional speculation having been discussed throughout their research history. At least in terms of diet, evidence seems to suggest that orientalosuchins may have been more generalist predators. The blunt, short snout differs from the morphology typically associated with piscivory, which is exemplified by members of the genus Maomingosuchus. Notably, Eocene orientalosuchins are consistently found alongside species of the latter across their range. In the Maoming Basin Dongnaosuchus occurs alongside Maomingosuchus petrolica, within the Na Duong Formation it is Orientalosuchus and Maomingosuchus acutirostris and at Krabi fossil evidence confirms the presence of an unnamed species of Maomingosuchus alongside Krabisuchus. In each case, the niche of a long-snouted piscivore appears to be filled by the local gavialoid. Instead of catching fish, the globular back teeth of orientalosuchins may have been better suited for cracking the armor of hard-shelled prey, suggesting general durophagy or possibly cheloniphagy. This matches the discovery of turtle shells from Na Duong that show direct signs of having been damaged by the jaws of a crocodilian, possibly Orientalosuchus. Crocodile bite marks were also found on mammal bones and crocodilian skull material within the same deposits, however, these have been attributed to a larger, possibly up to 6 m (20 ft) long, generalist similar in build to today's species of Crocodylus.

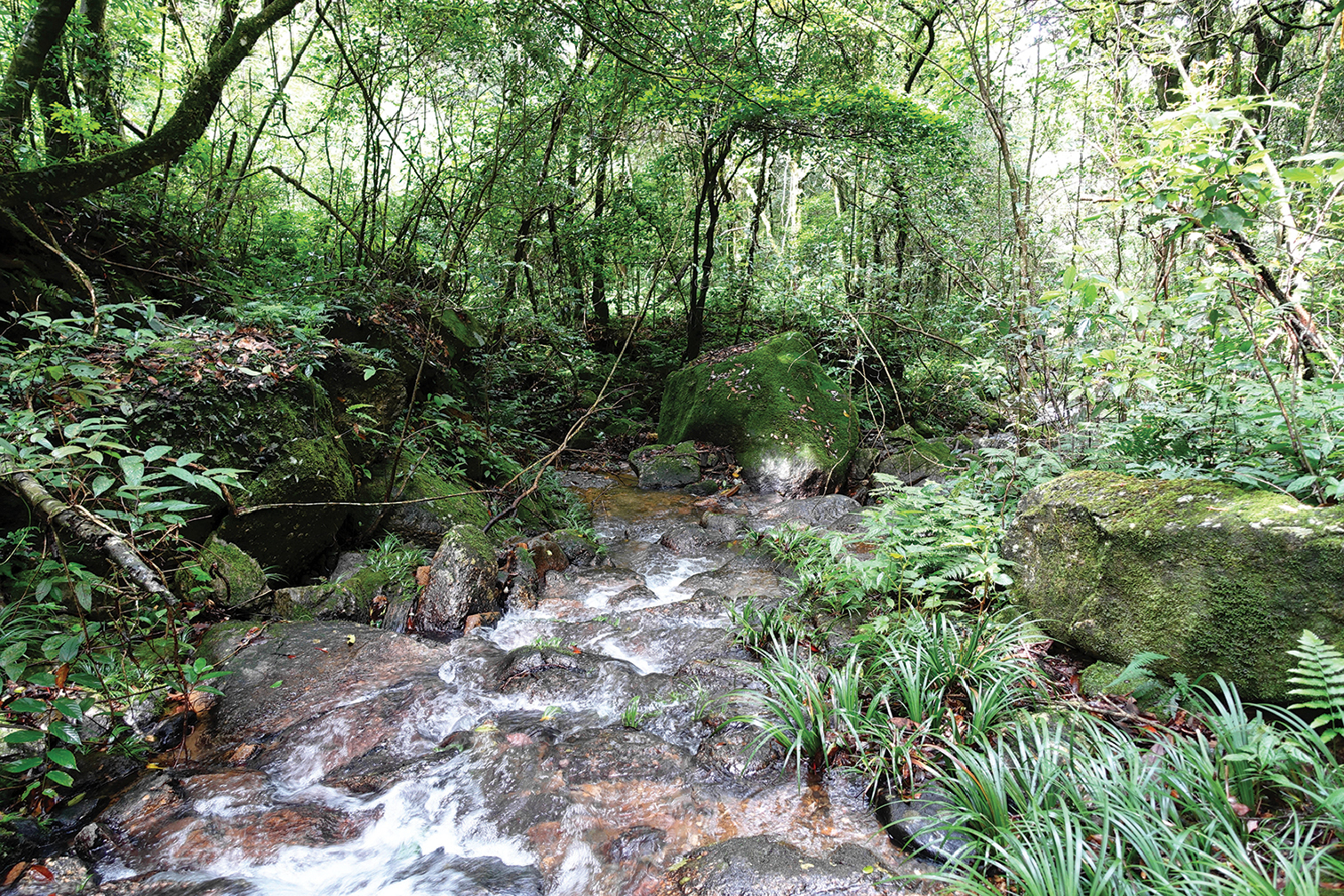
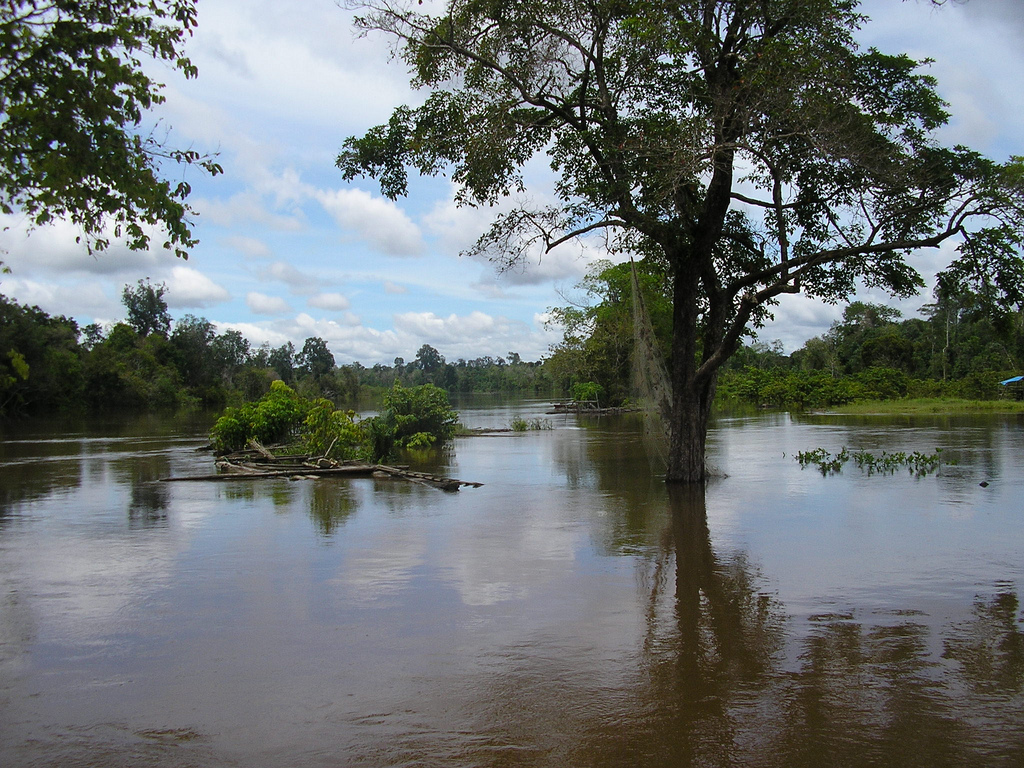
By the Eocene orientalosuchins were found in rainforest environments not dissimilar to those seen in modern-day Asia.

=== Lifestyle ===
Though generally found in deposits prominently featuring aquatic environments like ponds, swamps and lakes, it has been proposed that at least some orientalosuchins could have been slightly more terrestrial than other contemporary crocodilians. In the case of Dongnanosuchus, Skutschas and colleagues speculated that the comparable rarity of the orientalosuchin remains relative to those of Maomingosuchus could be tied to the two having preferred different habitats. They suggest that Dongnanosuchus may have spent more time on land than the contemporary gavialoid, citing a prior study by Martin and Lauprasert. This team had previously proposed that Krabisuchus spent more time on land than modern alligators, basing their hypothesis in the altirostral skull shape and the more forward-oriented narial opening. However, by 2023 Martin and colleagues more broadly referred to orientalosuchins as having had more semi-aquatic habits.

=== Paleoenvironment ===
Given that orientalosuchins spanned from the latest Cretaceous all the way into the late Eocene, members of this group existed in a wide range of environmental contexts. The oldest forms appeared in China at a time when dinosaurs were still the dominant megafauna, represented by groups such as tyrannosaurids, hadrosaurs, titanosaurs and a wide variety of oviraptorosaurs. All Cretaceous forms come from strata which are at times grouped together as the Nanxiong Formation of Nanxiong Group, though other researchers specify that both Eurycephalosuchus and Jiangxisuchus come from the Hekou Formation while the remains of Eoalligator were recovered from the Zhenshui Formation. In either case the environment of these sediments has been interpreted as a floodplain or alluvial fan experiencing periods of wet and dry climate.

There is direct evidence for the survival of Eoalligator across the KPG-boundary thanks to its continued presence into the lower Paleocene sediments of the Shanghu Formation. Protoalligator is known from the same time period, its fossils having been found in the similarly aged Whangudun Formation. In both cases these orientalosuchins were found alongside a rapdily diversifying mammal fauna including but not limited to mesonychids, early carnivorans, tillodonts, anagallids and pantodonts as well as other types of crocodilians.

By the Eocene orientalosuchins had established multiple geographically separated taxa spread across Southeast Asia. The formations that yielded the Eocene genera, namely the Na Duong Formation of Vietnam, the Krabi Basin of Thailand and the Youganwo Formation of China, are all described as tropical to warm-subtropical in their climate with extensive closed forests biomes likened to those still present in parts of Asia today. The forests are known to have been terrestrial in their nature and did not represent mangrove forests. All three regions also featured prominent bodies of freshwater as evidenced by a plethora of turtle remains, fish and the abundance of anthracotheres in these strata. The aquatic environments ranged from swamps to ponds, lakes, rivers and possibly brooks, though at least in the case of the Krabi Basin the presence of extensive river systems is considered to by unlikely based on the specific composition of the turtle fauna.

During this time the mammal fauna of Asia had changed significantly from that of the Paleocene, now also featuring early primates, various types of artiodactyls in addition to the anthracotheres such as mouse deer, predatory miacids, colugos and perissodactyls such as basal rhinos.
