= Qianshanosuchus =

Qianshanosuchus Temporal range: Paleocene

Scientific classification
- Domain: Eukaryota
- Kingdom: Animalia
- Phylum: Chordata
- Class: Reptilia
- Clade: Archosauria
- Order: Crocodilia
- Genus: †Qianshanosuchus; Boerman et al., 2022
- Species: †Q. youngi

Binomial name
- †Qianshanosuchus youngi Boerman et al., 2022

Extinct genus of crocodyloids

Qianshanosuchus is a genus of basal crocodyloid from the Paleocene of the Qianshan Basin, China. The fossil material, which includes an incomplete skull and parts of the lower jaw, show various features usually associated with juvenile crocodiles alongside various unique traits that were used to erect a new genus. It is the first and only basal crocodyloid currently known from the Paleocene of China, which had previously only yielded alligatoroids and planocraniids. Its presence in this part of the world and its basal position to species of the genus Asiatosuchus supports the idea that crocodyloids dispersed from Asia into Europe. Qianshanosuchus only includes a single species, Qianshanosuchus youngi.

== History and naming ==
Qianshanosuchus is known from only a single specimen, IBCAS QS15, an incomplete skull and an associated part of the mandible. Based on the small size of the holotype and several anatomical traits, it is thought to preserve a juvenile specimen. The material was collected near Xialou village in the Qianshan Basin of China by a joint expedition of Belgian and Chinese researchers. Preparation was handled by the Museum of Natural Sciences of Belgium and the fossils were curated by the Institute of Botany, Chinese Academy of Sciences.

The genus name derives from the Qianshan Basin and the Greek 'soukhos' for "crocodile". The species is named after Yang Zhongjian, also known as Chung-Chien Young.

== Description ==
The skull of Qianshanosuchus is small, measuring only 9.7 cm (3.8 in) from the tip of the snout to the back of the skull, one of several traits that indicate that the material belonged to a juvenile. The maxillary foramen, a hole in the skull for the fifth cranial nerve, is notably enlarged. The suture where the squamosal and parietal bones meet is situated on a ridge and an acute notch stretches over the parietal and supraoccipital, the later of which is largely exposed on the skull table. The dorsal edge of the orbits is raised and on the mandible the surangular features a prominent ridge on the lateral side of the bone.

Of five premaxillary teeth, only the last is preserved and shows a smooth surface with no visible ridges. While only this tooth is present in the premaxillae, based on the size of the alveoli the third and fourth were the largest in this part of the jaw. The maxillae preserve only six alveoli, but based on the size of them and the bad preservation of the rest of the bone, it is likely that in life the animal would have had between eight and sixteen maxillary teeth. The preserved teeth are thought to represent the first, second, third, fifth and possibly the ninth tooth of the maxilla. All of them are angled labially (outwards) and show slight lateral compression, which is typically seen in juvenile crocodilians but also found in adult planocranids.

Several other features of the skull are also indicative of the fact that the material that forms Qianshanosuchus belonged to a juvenile. This includes the relative size of the orbits compared to the full skull and similarly the size of the skull table compared to the total skull width. Overall, the orbits take up three quarters of the skulls width and one quarter of its length. The supratemporal fenestrae are shallow and widely spaced as seen in the juveniles of modern species, the skull lacks the pronounced ornamentation that is typical for adult crocodiles and various other characters related to the teeth, frontal bone and other elements likewise suggest that the specimen was not yet mature at the time of its death. In spite of these variable features however, those deemed diagnostic for Qianshanosuchus were determined to be unaffected by ontogeny in modern crocodilians. The only exception regards the upturned margins of the orbits, which remain unchanged in some species but disappear with age in others.

== Phylogeny ==
To determine the relationship between Qianshanosuchus and other crocodylians, two different datasets had been used by Boerman and colleagues. The matrix of Shan et al. (2021) was chosen as the first dataset due to its extensive coverage of Asian crocodylians. The second matrix on the other hand, Rio and Mannion (2021), offers a series of additional advantages and disadvantages compared to Shan's dataset. Rio and Mannion included several additional characters with more reductive coding and more objective wording. However, unlike the former, this dataset did not include a large amount of basal crocodyloids or most orientalosuchines. The two matrices subsequently differ notably in how they recover the internal relationships of Crocodylia. Shan et al. recovers Tomistominae as an independent group more closely related to Crocodylidae than to the basal Gavialoidea, while the other dataset shows tomistomines and gavialines as forming a clade more derived than Alligatoridae.

As the material of Qianshanosuchus is thought to have belonged to a juvenile, both matrices were used multiple times under changed circumstances to account for any features that would change with age. Initial analysis took the datasets as they were while additional tests either removed any juvenile characters from Qianshanosuchus or included data for juvenile specimens of the American alligator and Nile crocodile. Using the matrix of Shan et al. consistently recovered Qianshanosuchus as a basal member of Crocodyloidea, less derived than the various species of Asiatosuchus. This outcome remained unchanged regardless of the inclusion of juvenile characters. Likewise, the results formed by the Rio and Mannion matrix showed little impact of the juvenile characters on the general placement of Qianshanosuchus. Unlike in the former tests, here the taxon was placed outside of Crocodyloidea and even Longirostres (a clade formed by crocodyloids and gavialoids). This dataset found it to consistently align itself with Asiatosuchus, although the exact relations of the formed clade varied slightly across the analysis.

Boerman and colleagues conclude that, although the precise topology of the different crocodilian clades differ between analysis and matrices, Qianshanosuchus consistently shows affinities with taxa typically considered to be basal crocodyloids. They argue that the different results stemming from the Rio and Mannion matrix may partially be caused by their relative recency and tentatively assign Qianshanosuchus to the Crocodyloidea. The two phylogenetic trees below show Qianshanosuchus' position as recovered with the matrix of Shan et al. (left) and Rio & Mannion (right) respectively without changes to the dataset to account for juvenile traits.

- Crocodilia
  - Gavialoidea
  - - Borealosuchus spp.
    - - Planocraniidae
      - - Alligatoroidea
        - Crocodyloidea
          - Qianshanosuchus youngi
          - - Albertosuchus knudsenii
            - - Prodiplocynodon langi
              - - "Asiatosuchus" germanicus
                - - - Asiatosuchus grangeri
                    - "Asiatosuchus" depressifrons
                    - "Asiatosuchus" affinis
                  - - Tomistominae
                    - - Mekosuchinae
                      - Crocodylidae
                        - Osteolaeminae
                        - Crocodylinae

- Crocodilia
  - Alligatoroidea
  - - Planocraniidae
    - - - "Asiatosuchus" depressifrons
        - - Qianshanosuchus youngi
          - - "Asiatosuchus" affinis
            - "Asiatosuchus" germanicus
      - - Jiangxisuchus nankangensis
        - Longirostres
          - Gavialoidea
            - Tomistominae
            - Gavialinae
          - Crocodyloidea
            - Osteolaeminae
            - - Mekosuchinae
              - Crocodylinae

== Biogeography ==
Qianshanosuchus represents the first basal crocodyloid known from the Paleocene of China, with the previously oldest member of this clade being Asiatosuchus grangeri from the middle Eocene, approximately 15 to 20 million years later. Phylogenetic analysis following the matrix of Shan et al. suggests that Qianshanosuchus would be immediately basal to Prodiplocynodon and Albertosuchus, two taxa from the late Cretaceous of North America. Following these results, this would require the Asian Qianshanosuchus to have diverged from its North American relatives at some point during the Maastrichtian, a hypothesis which could be corroborated by Jiangxisuchus from the Cretaceous of China. Previous analysis have placed it as a basal crocodyloid, however during the description of Qianshanosuchus it was recovered as an alligatoroid instead. Regardless, this dispersal may have occurred through the Bering land bridge, which would have been exposed during the Maastrichtian. Although alligatoroids were suggested to have also dispersed from North America to Europe prior to the Eocene, the lack of crocodyloids in Cretaceous Europe suggests that the ancestors of Qianshanosuchus likely did not arrive in China over this western route. Additionally, the recovered relationship to "Asiatosuchus" depressifrons and "Asiatosuchus" germanicus from France and Germany would lend support to the further dispersals of crocodyloids from Asia onwards to Europe, at least following the results using the Shan et al. matrix. It is also possible that crocodyloids dispersed into Europe more than once, as "Asiatosuchus" depressifrons was found to be more closely related to Asiatosuchus species from Asia and North America than to the other European species.
