= Albertosuchus =

Albertosuchus Temporal range: Maastrichtian ~70–66 Ma

Scientific classification
- Kingdom: Animalia
- Phylum: Chordata
- Class: Reptilia
- Order: Crocodylia
- Family: incertae sedis
- Genus: †Albertosuchus; Wu and Brinkman, 2015

Type species
- †Albertosuchus knudsenii Wu and Brinkman, 2015

Extinct genus of reptiles

Albertosuchus is an extinct genus of crocodyloid crocodylian from the Late Cretaceous of Canada. The type species Albertosuchus knudsenii was named in 2015 from the Scollard Formation in Alberta. Albertosuchus is the northernmost-known Late Cretaceous crocodylian in North America.

Albertosuchus lacks the notch in the upper jaw between the maxilla and premaxilla bones that is characteristic of most crocodyloids, and it also has a very short mandibular symphysis (the connection between the two halves of the lower jaw). Phylogenetic analysis indicates that it is one of the most basal members of Crocodyloidea and a close relative of Arenysuchus from the Late Cretaceous of Spain, although the incomplete nature of known material makes these findings uncertain.
