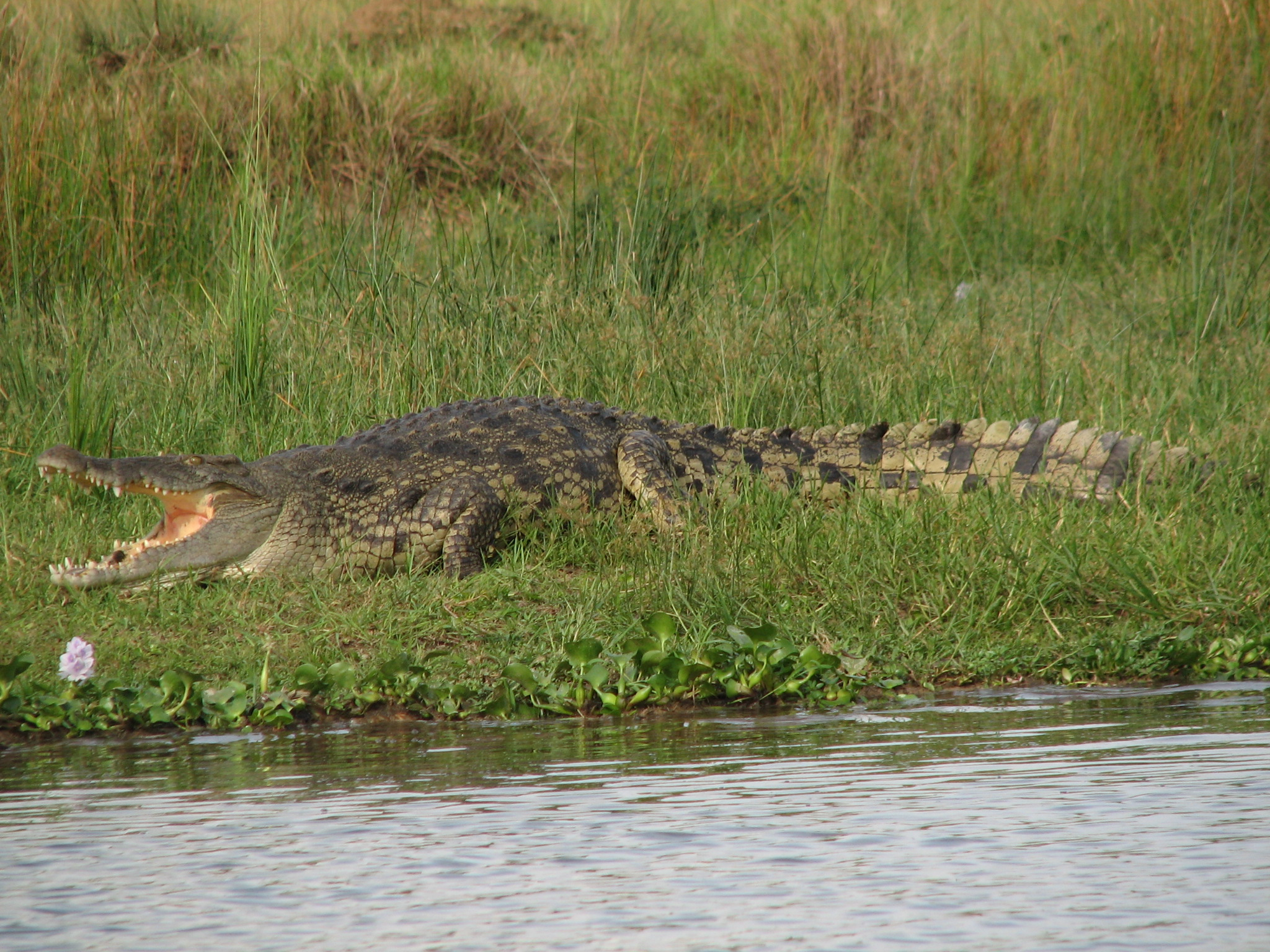
- Crocodylus niloticus (Nile crocodile)

Scientific classification
- Kingdom: Animalia
- Phylum: Chordata
- Class: Reptilia
- Order: Crocodylia
- Clade: Longirostres
- Superfamily: Crocodyloidea; Fitzinger, 1826

Subgroups
- †Albertosuchus; †Astorgosuchus; †"Crocodylus" megarhinus; †Qianshanosuchus; Crocodylidae; †Mekosuchinae?

= Crocodyloidea =

Crocodyloidea Temporal range: Maastrichtian–Present

Superfamily of crocodiles

Crocodyloidea is one of three superfamilies of crocodilians, the other two being Alligatoroidea and Gavialoidea, and it includes the crocodiles. Crocodyloidea may also include the extinct Mekosuchinae, native to Australasia from the Eocene to the Holocene, although this is disputed.

== Classification ==
Cladistically, it is defined as Crocodylus niloticus (the Nile crocodile) and all crocodylians more closely related to C. niloticus than to either Alligator mississippiensis (the American alligator) or Gavialis gangeticus (the gharial). This is a stem-based definition for crocodiles, and is more inclusive than the crown group Crocodylidae. As a crown group, Crocodylidae only includes the last common ancestor of all extant (living) crocodiles and their descendants (living or extinct), whereas Crocodyloidea, as a stem group, also includes more basal extinct crocodile ancestors that are more closely related to living crocodiles than to alligators or gavialids. When considering only living taxa (neontology), this makes Crocodyloidea and Crocodylidae synonymous, and only Crocodylidae is used. Thus, Crocodyloidea is only used in the context of paleontology.

Traditionally, crocodiles and alligators were considered more closely related and grouped together in the clade Brevirostres, to the exclusion of the gharials. This classification was based on morphological studies primarily focused on analyzing skeletal traits of living and extinct fossil species. However, recent molecular studies using DNA sequencing have rejected Brevirostres upon finding the crocodiles and gavialids to be more closely related than the alligators. The new clade Longirostres was named by Harshman et al. in 2003.

A 2018 tip dating study by Lee & Yates simultaneously using morphological, molecular (DNA sequencing), and stratigraphic (fossil age) data established the inter-relationships within Crocodilia, which was expanded upon in 2021 by Hekkala et al. using paleogenomics by extracting DNA from the extinct Voay.

The below cladogram shows the results of the latest study, and how Crocodyloidea may only contain one additional taxon beyond Crocodylidae:

- Crocodylia (crown group)
  - Alligatoroidea (stem-based group)
    - extinct basal Alligatoroids†
    - Alligatoridae (crown group)
      - Caimaninae
        - - Caiman
          - Melanosuchus
        - Paleosuchus
      - Alligatorinae
        Alligator
  - - extinct basal Crocodilians† (including Mekosuchinae†)
    - Longirostres (crown group)
      - Crocodyloidea (stem-based group)
        - "Crocodylus" megarhinus†
        - Crocodylidae (crown group)
          - Crocodylus
          - - Mecistops
            - Osteolaemus
      - Gavialoidea (stem-based group)
        - extinct basal Gavialoids†
        - Gavialidae (crown group)
          - Gavialis
          - Tomistoma
