= China National Highway 104 =

Road in China

National Highway 104
- 104国道

Route information
- Length: 2,420 km (1,500 mi)

Major junctions
- From: Beijing
- To: Pingtan, Fujian

Location
- Country: China

Highway system
- National Trunk Highway System; Primary; Auxiliary
← G103	→ G105

China National Highway 104 (G104) runs from Beijing to Pingtan via Jinan, Xuzhou, Nanjing, Hangzhou, Taizhou and Fuzhou.

It runs to approximately 2420 km, and, on a map, runs southeast towards Nanjing and Hangzhou before turning south-southwest at Taizhou. In 2013, under a new 2013-2030 plan by NDRC and MoT, the G102 has been extended to Pingtan.

Leaving Beijing, it first runs as part of South Zhongzhou Road and is also known as Nanyuan Road (for being close to the Nanyuan area). However, it then diverts southwest and becomes the highway unto itself.

== Route and distance ==
Route and distance

City	Distance (km)
Beijing, Beijing	0
Langfang, Hebei	56
Xiqing District, Tianjin	118
Jinghai, Tianjin	149
Qing County, Hebei	202
Cangzhou, Hebei	238
Botou, Hebei	278
Dongguang, Hebei	300
Wuqiao, Hebei	331
Dezhou, Shandong	355
Ling County, Shandong	387
Linyi County, Shandong	419
Jinan, Shandong	481
Tai'an, Shandong	554
Qufu, Shandong	628
Zoucheng, Shandong	651
Tengzhou, Shandong	691
Weishan County, Shandong	727
Xuzhou, Jiangsu	804
Suining County, Jiangsu	895
Si County, Anhui	948
Wuhe County, Anhui	984
Mingguang, Anhui	1029
Chuzhou, Anhui	1092
Nanjing, Jiangsu	1169
Jiangning District, Jiangsu	1185
Jurong, Jiangsu	1221
Liyang, Jiangsu	1298
Yixing, Jiangsu	1333
Huzhou, Zhejiang	1409
Deqing County, Zhejiang	1452
Hangzhou, Zhejiang	1509
Xiaoshan, Zhejiang	1543
Shaoxing, Zhejiang	1584
Shangyu, Zhejiang	1619
Shengzhou, Zhejiang	1643
Xinchang, Zhejiang	1693
Tiantai County, Zhejiang	1745
Linhai, Zhejiang	1792
Yueqing, Zhejiang	1921
Wenzhou, Zhejiang	1984
Rui'an, Zhejiang	2021
Pingyang County, Zhejiang	2036
Cangnan, Zhejiang	2064
Fuding, Fujian	2095
Zherong, Fujian	2140
Fu'an, Fujian	2192
Ningde, Fujian	2275
Luoyuan, Fujian	2321
Lianjiang County, Fujian	2362
Mawei District, Fujian	2400
Fuzhou, Fujian	2420

== See also ==
- China National Highways
