= Huangbai =

Huangbai may refer to:

- Huang Bai (黄柏), an herb used in traditional Chinese medicine
- Huangbai River (黄柏河)

== Populated places ==
- Huangbai Town (黄柏镇) in Qianshan, Anhui
- Huangbai Township, Dexing (黄柏乡) in Dexing, Jiangxi
- Huangbai Township, Zherong County (黄柏乡) in Zherong County, Ningde, Fujian
- Huangbai Township, Ruijin (黄柏乡) in Ruijin, Ganzhou, Jiangxi
- Huangbai Village (黄柏村) in Hubei, Fujian
