= Hubei, Fujian =

Hubei 虎贝镇
- Town
- Location in Fujian Hubei (China)
- Coordinates: 26°45′8″N 119°16′9″E
- Country: People's Republic of China
- Province: Fujian
- Prefecture-level city: Ningde
- District: Jiaocheng District
- Time zone: UTC+8 (China Standard)

Hubei (simplified Chinese: 虎贝; traditional Chinese: 虎貝; pinyin: Hǔbèi) is a town in Jiaocheng District, Ningde, Fujian province, China. As of 2020, it has 18 villages under its administration:

- Chalu Village (岔路村)
- Dongyuan Village (东源村)
- Fushan Village (浮山村)
- Huangbai Village (黄柏村)
- Huangjia Village (黄家村)
- Jiucuo Village (旧厝村)
- Meihe Village (梅鹤村)
- Nanling Village (南岭村)
- Qidian Village (七淀村)
- Shangpu Village (上堡村)
- Wenfeng Village (文峰村)
- Xialou Village (下楼村)
- Xiayang Village (下洋村)
- Xinting Village (新亭村)
- Xincuo Village (新厝村)
- Yanbing Village (岩柄村)
- Zhongyangli Village (中洋里村)
- Jiadi Village (甲地村)

== See also ==
- List of township-level divisions of Fujian
