= Haidao Township =

Islands of Fujian

Haidao Township 海岛乡
- Township
- Location in the East China Sea Haidao Township (Southeast Asia) Haidao Township (Asia)
- Country: People's Republic of China
- Province: Fujian
- Prefecture-level city: Ningde
- County: Xiapu
- Villages: 6

Area
  - Total: 29.8 km^{2} (11.5 sq mi)

Population (2010)
  - Total: 7,915
  - Density: 266/km^{2} (688/sq mi)
- Time zone: UTC+8 (China Standard)

Location of Haidao Township

Haidao Township (Chinese: 海岛乡; pinyin: Hǎidǎo Xiāng; Wade–Giles: Hai^{3}-tao^{3} Hsiang^{1}; lit. 'township of the islands of the sea') is an insular township off the Asian mainland in Xiapu County, Ningde, Fujian, China (PRC). The township is immediately north of present-day Lienchiang County (the Matsu Islands), ROC (Taiwan).

== History ==
On 15 December 1950, the Matsu Administrative Office (馬祖行政公署) of Fujian Province, Republic of China was established including modern-day Lienchiang County (the Matsu Islands), ROC (Taiwan) as well as islands in present-day Haidao Township including the Sishuang Islands (四礵), Xiyang (西洋), and Fuying (浮鷹) as well as Taishan (台山) in present-day Shacheng, Fuding.

On 29 December 1950, the Daxiyang Island was attacked by Chinese Communist forces and defended by guerrilla forces.

On 27 July 1951, ten motorized with over four hundred Chinese Communist soldiers attacked Xiyang Island. More than sixty guerrilla soldiers defending the island died. Xiyang District (西洋區) leader Li Kuei-Yu (李貴漁) and Sishuang District (四礵區) leader Wang Chen-Chi (王振基) died in a grenade attack. The attacking force retreated.

In early July 1953, Chinese Nationalist guerillas retreated from islands in the Xiyang Island (Chihchutao) area. The area came under the control of Chinese Communists on 13 July 1953.

On 29 November 1954, Haidao District (海岛区) was established.

In 1958, Haidao Commune (海岛公社) was established.

In 1984, Haidao Township (海岛乡) was established.

In August 2012, the Haidao Township, Xiapu County Uninhabited Island Environmental Protection Volunteer Service Unit (霞浦县海岛乡无人岛屿环境保护志愿者服务队), forerunner of the Xiapu County Island Environmental Protection Organization (霞浦县岛屿环境保护协会), was established.

In March 2016, a woman was murdered in Beishuang Village and two suspects were apprehended.

From 25 to 27 May 2018, the 2018 Xiapu, China Ocean Fishing Competition was held in the Sishuang islands.

In late April 2019, representatives from the nearby Dongyin Township's government (ROC) visited Haidao Township.

== Geography ==
Islands in Haidao Township include:

- Xiyang Island (西洋岛), also known as Spider Island (Zhizhu Island, Chihchu Island, Chih-chu Tao; 蜘蛛島) 26.509879°N 120.045344°E
- Fuying Island (浮鹰岛), also known as Double Peak Island (Shuangfeng Island; 雙峯島) 26.578459°N 120.140509°E
- the Sishuang Islands (Sishuang Liedao, Pei-shuang Lieh-tao; 四礵列岛)
  - Beishuang Island (Pei-shuang; 北礵岛) 26.702357°N 120.352581°E
  - Dongshuang Island (Tung-shuang; 东礵岛) 26.681677°N 120.382951°E
  - Xishuang Island (Hsi-shuang; 西礵岛) 26.654204°N 120.321156°E
  - Nanshuang Island (Nan-shuang; 南礵岛) 26.645148°N 120.356295°E
- Xiaoxiyang Island (小西洋岛), also known as Isthmus Island (Yisimasi Island, I-ssu-ma-ssu Tao; 乙四馬四島) 26.546441°N 120.001213°E
- Kuishan Island (Kuishan Dao; 魁山岛), also known as Zhuishan (Chui Shan; 錐山) 26.493586°N 120.134632°E
- Maci Island (Ma Chick; 马刺岛) 26.538001°N 120.139128°E
- Nigu Island (Nu Geu Sen; 尼姑屿) 26.557534°N 120.151459°E
- Wu Island (Inside Island; 乌屿) 26.556564°N 119.968421°E
- Ma'an Island (马鞍岛) 26.529661°N 120.022837°E
- Dadong Island (大东屿) 26.502041°N 119.983012°E

Liang Island in Beigan Township, Lienchiang County (the Matsu Islands), ROC (Taiwan) is 19.25 kilometers (11.96 mi) from Kuishan Island in the township. The Sishuang islands are north-northwest of Dongyin Township, Lienchiang County (the Matsu Islands), ROC (Taiwan).

Xiyang and Fuying Island are divided from mainland Asia by the Xiao'an Channel (Xiao'an Shuidao, Hsiao An Shui Tao; 小安水道).

== Administrative divisions ==
Haidao Township includes six villages centered on three of the islands:

Xiyang Island:

- Gongdong (宫东村), Gongxi (宫西村) and Yantai (烟台村)

Fuying Island:

- Li'ao (里澳村) and Wen'ao (文澳村)

Beishuang Island:

- Beishuang (北礵村)

== Demographics ==
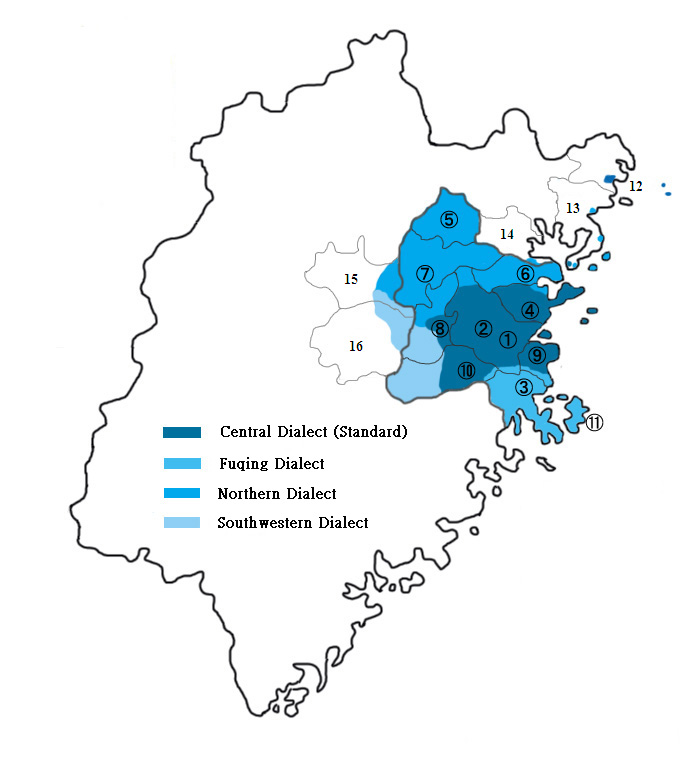
Residents of Haidao Township speak the Northern Dialect of the Fuzhou Dialect of Eastern Min

Historical population
Year	Pop.	±% p.a.
2000	10,871	—
2010	7,915	−3.12%

== Economy ==
Most of the residents are involved in fishing-related work.

== Gallery ==
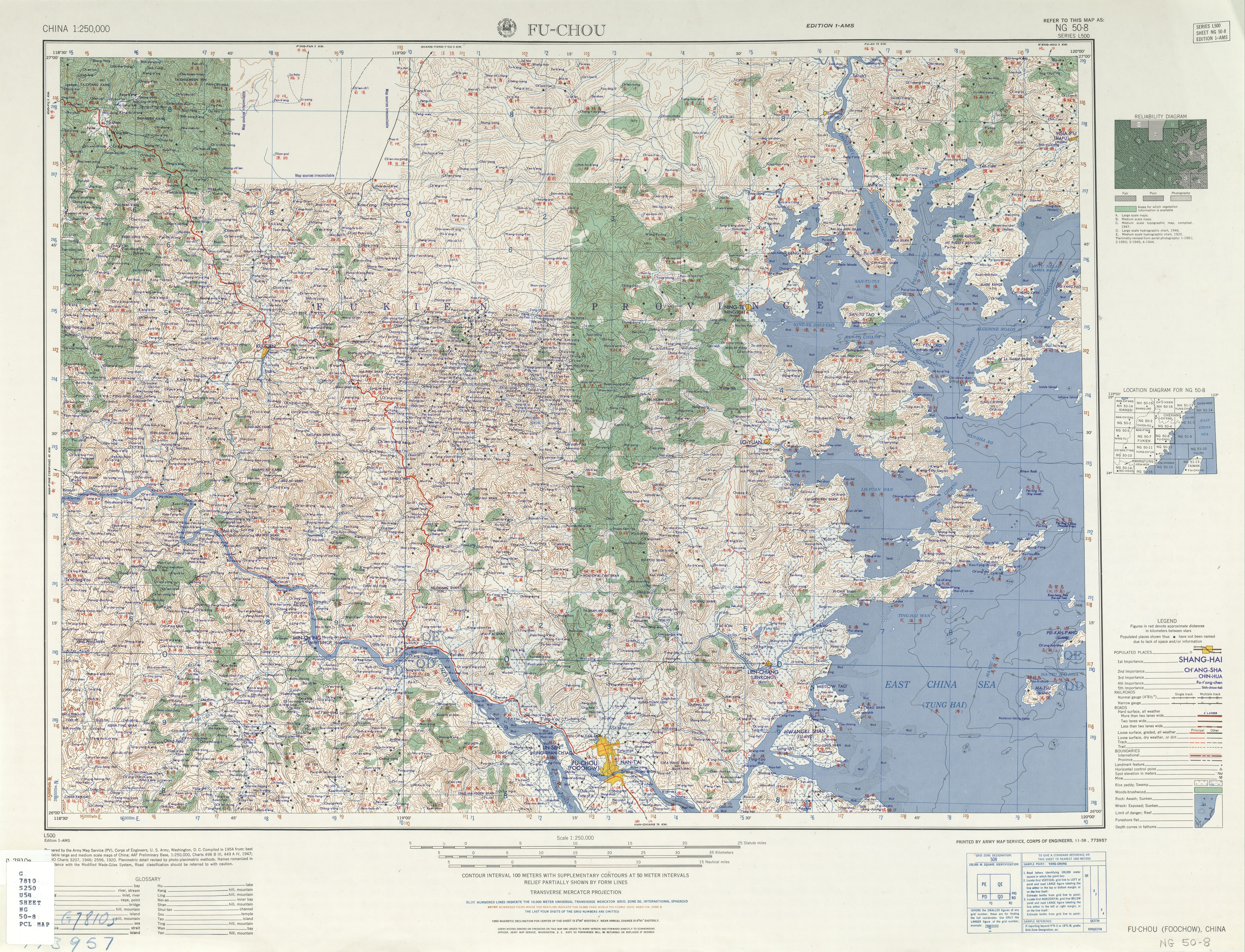
Map including some islands in the western part of present-day Haidao Township (AMS, 1954)

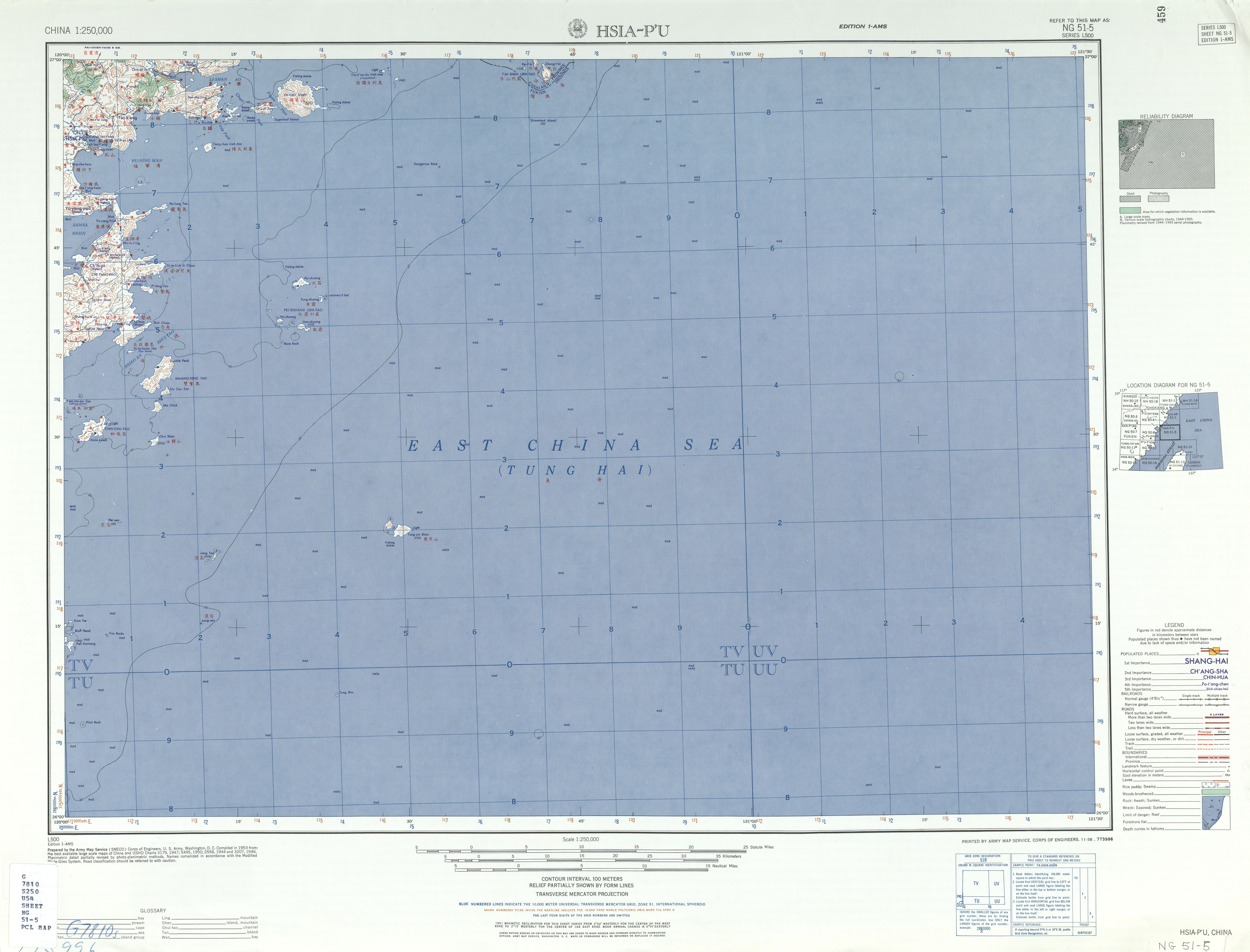
Map including most of present-day Haidao Township (AMS, 1953)

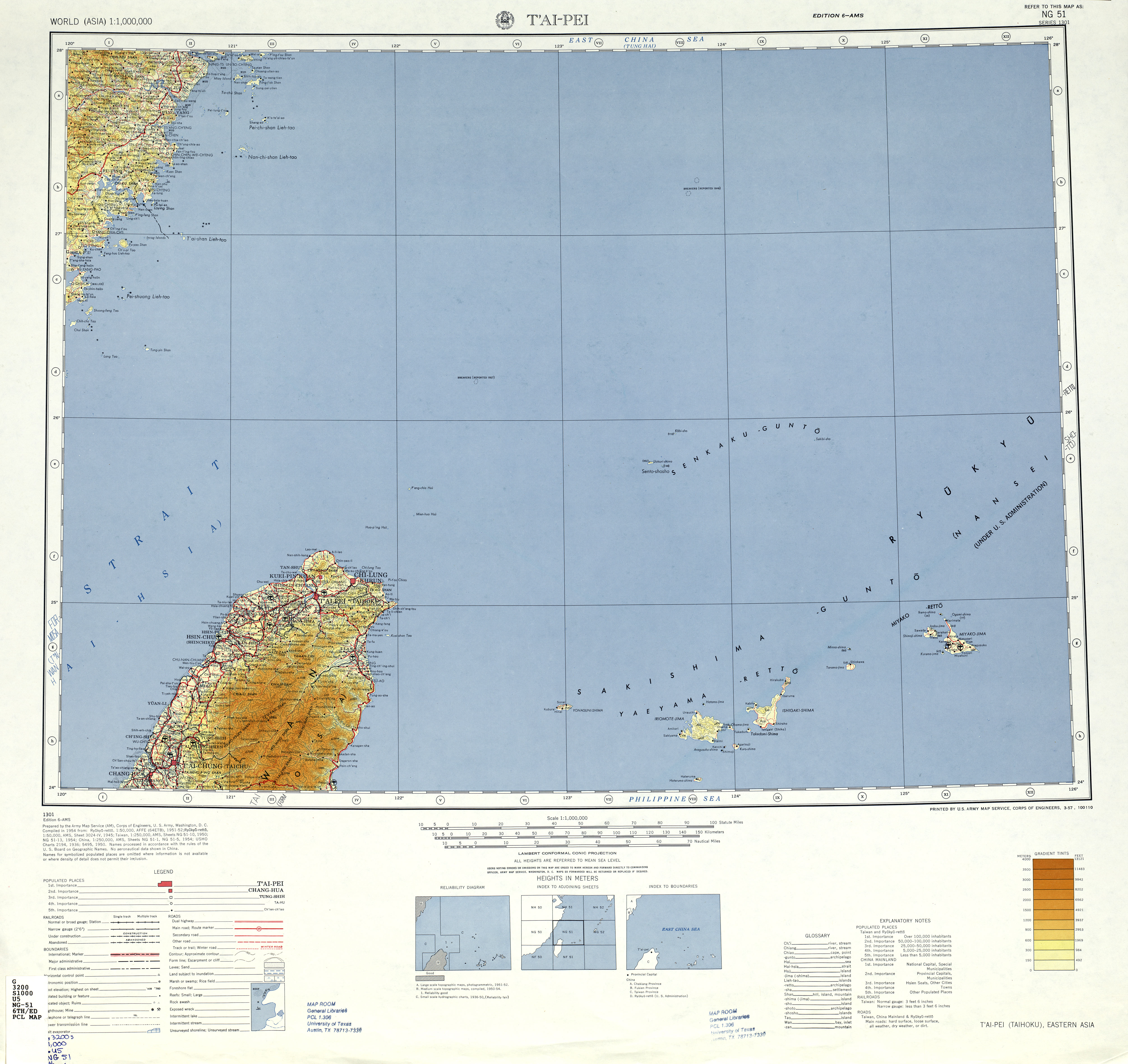
Map including present-day Haidao Township area (AMS, 1954)

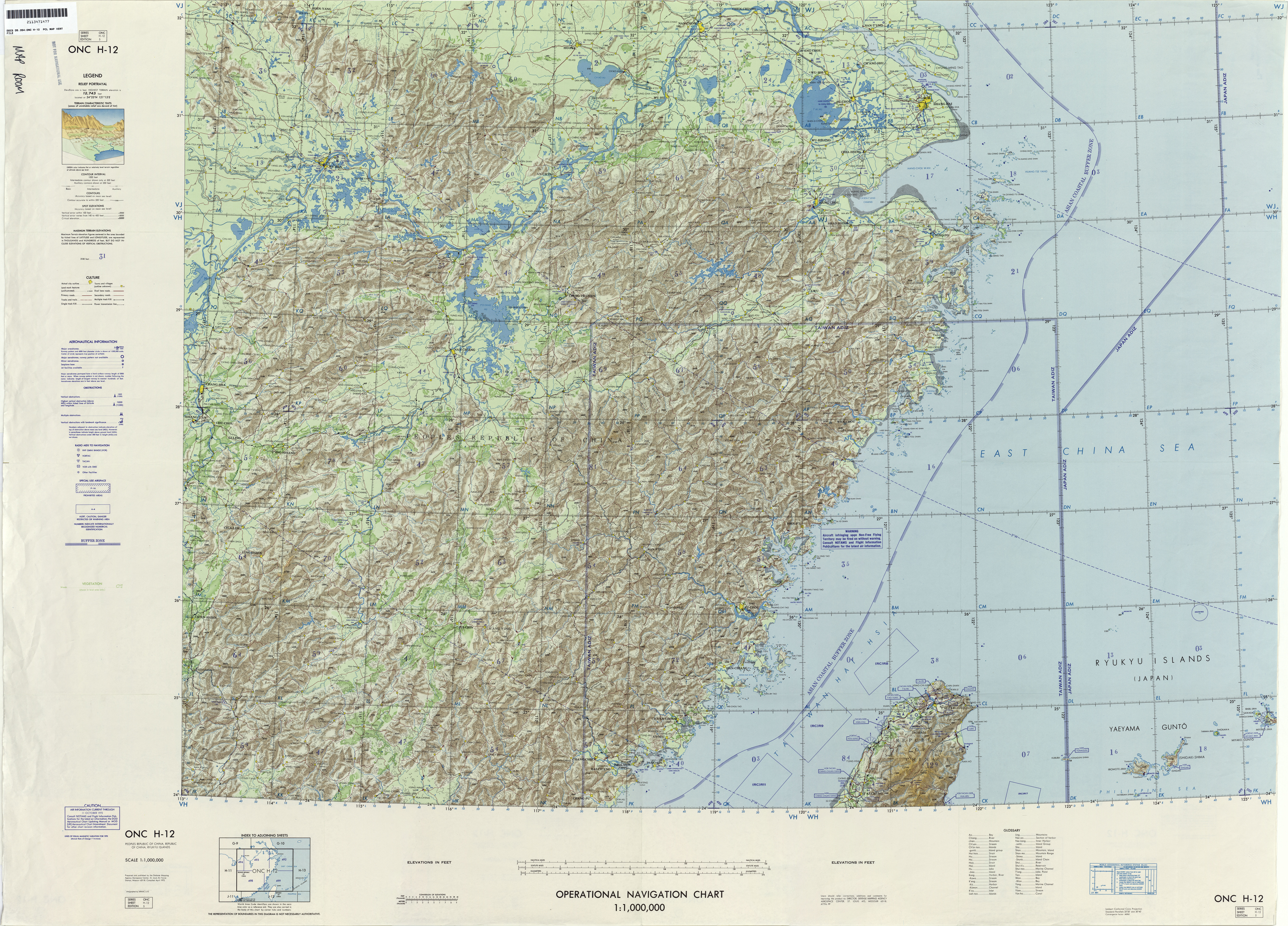
Map including present-day Haidao Township area (DMA, 1972)

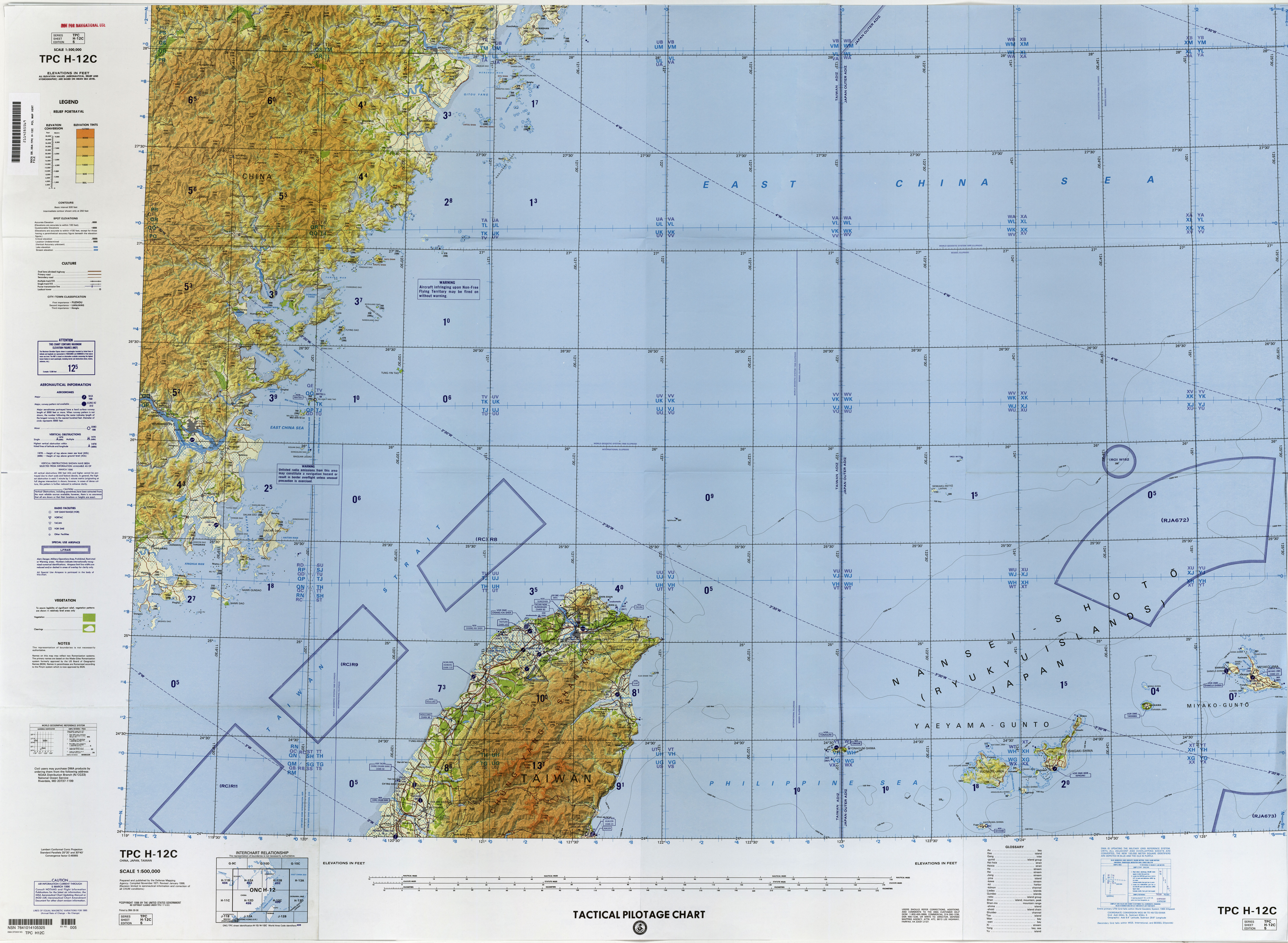
Map including present-day Haidao Township area (DMA, compiled 1971, revised 1996)

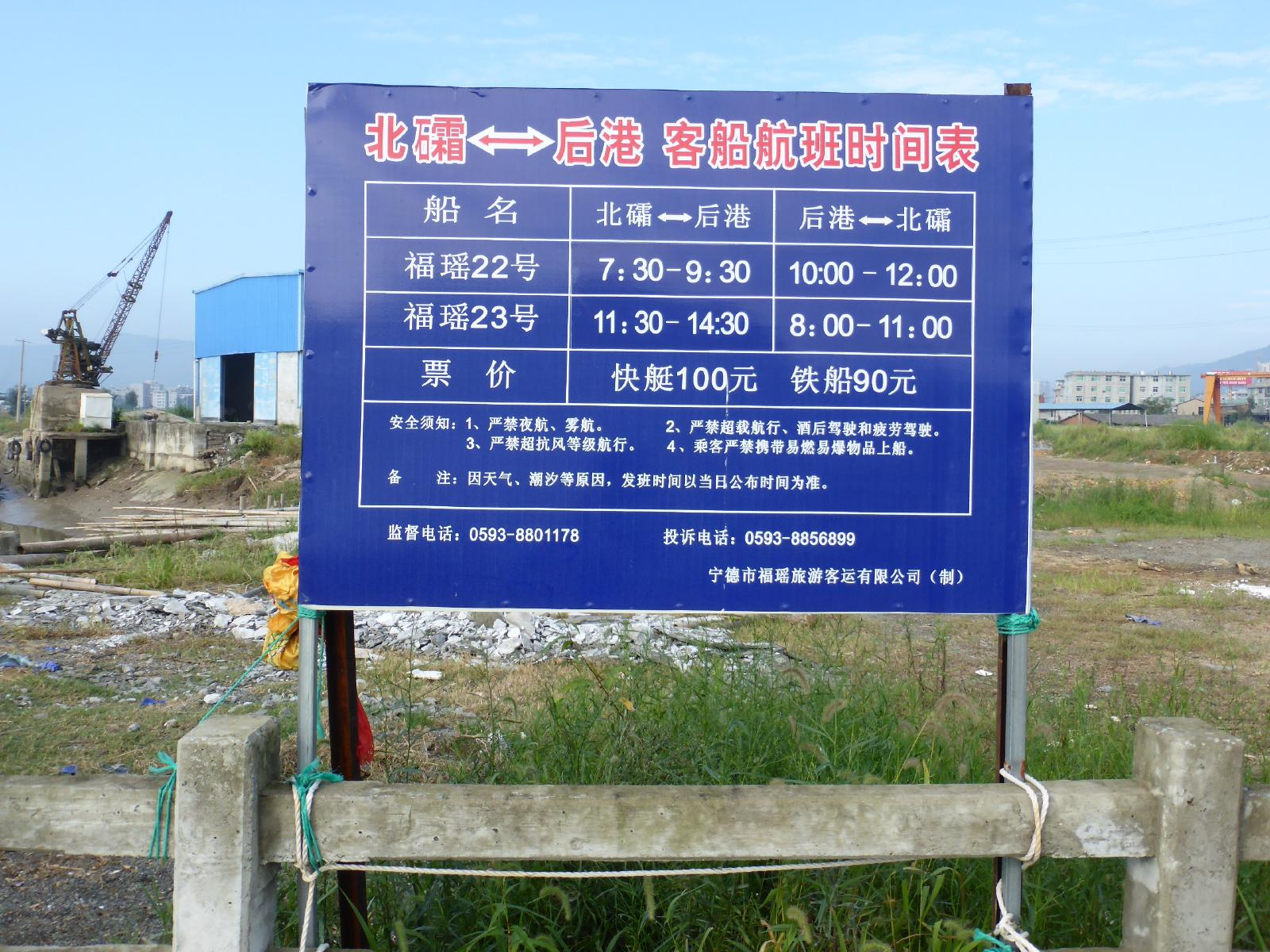
Beishuang (北礵) - Hougang (后港) ferry schedule

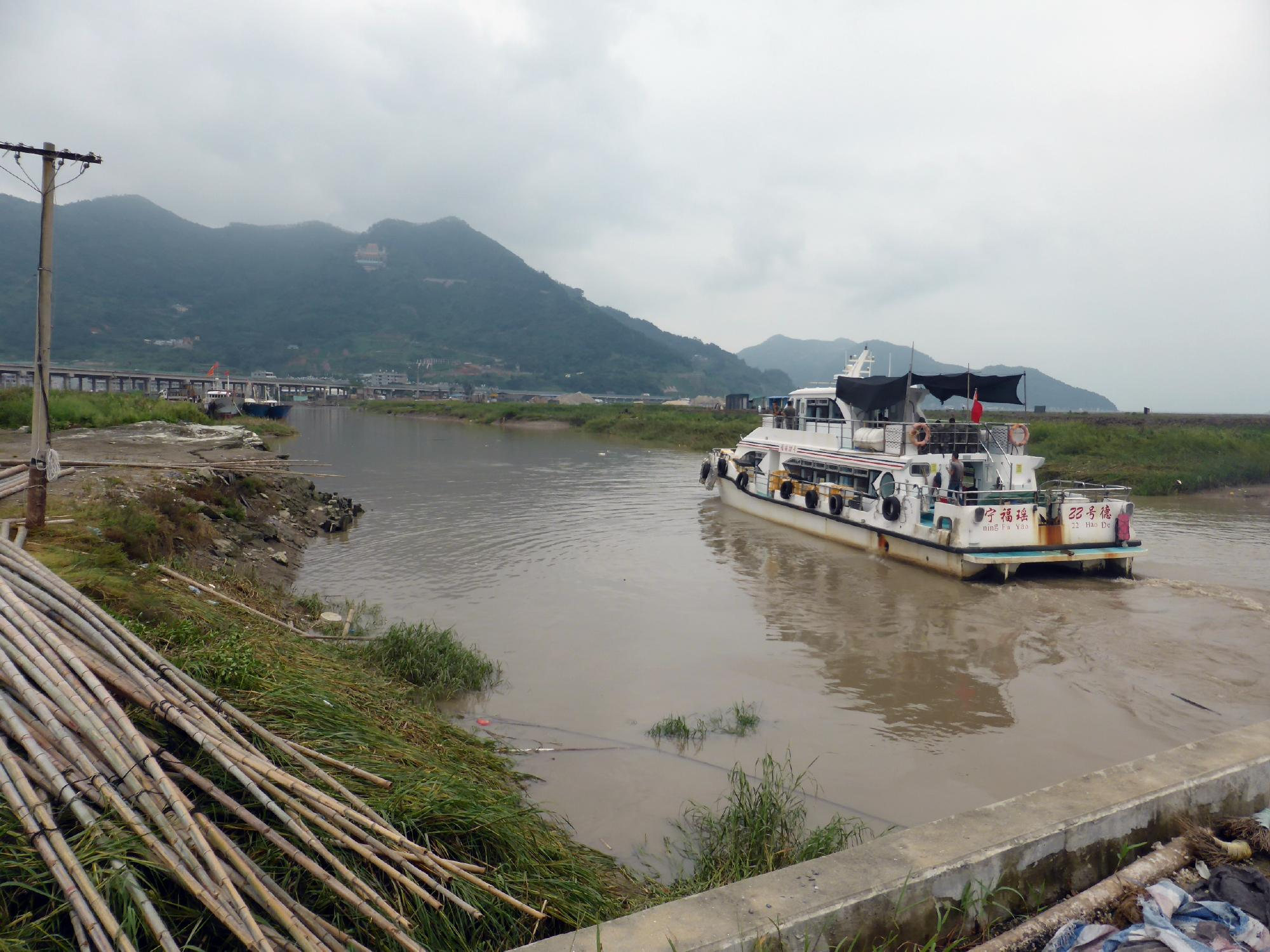
Ferry

== See also ==
- List of islands of China
