= Tongcheng =

Tongcheng may refer to the following places in China:

- Tongcheng, Anhui (桐城市), county-level city
- Tongcheng County (通城县), Xianning, Hubei
- Tongcheng, Linquan County (同城镇), Anhui
- Tongcheng, Tianchang (铜城镇), Anhui
- Tongcheng, Shanxi (桐城镇), town in Wenxi County
- Tongchengshangwuquxiyuzhuang station (同城商务区西于庄), metro station in Xiyuzhuang Subdistrict, Hongqiao District, Tianjin
- Tongcheng Subdistrict, Fuding (桐城街道), Fujian
- Tongcheng Subdistrict, Harbin (通城街道), in Acheng District, Harbin, Heilongjiang
- Tongcheng Subdistrict, Dong'e County (铜城街道), Shandong
