= Liang Island =

Islet west of Taiwan

Coordinates: 26°20′20″N 120°13′12″E

Native name: 亮島
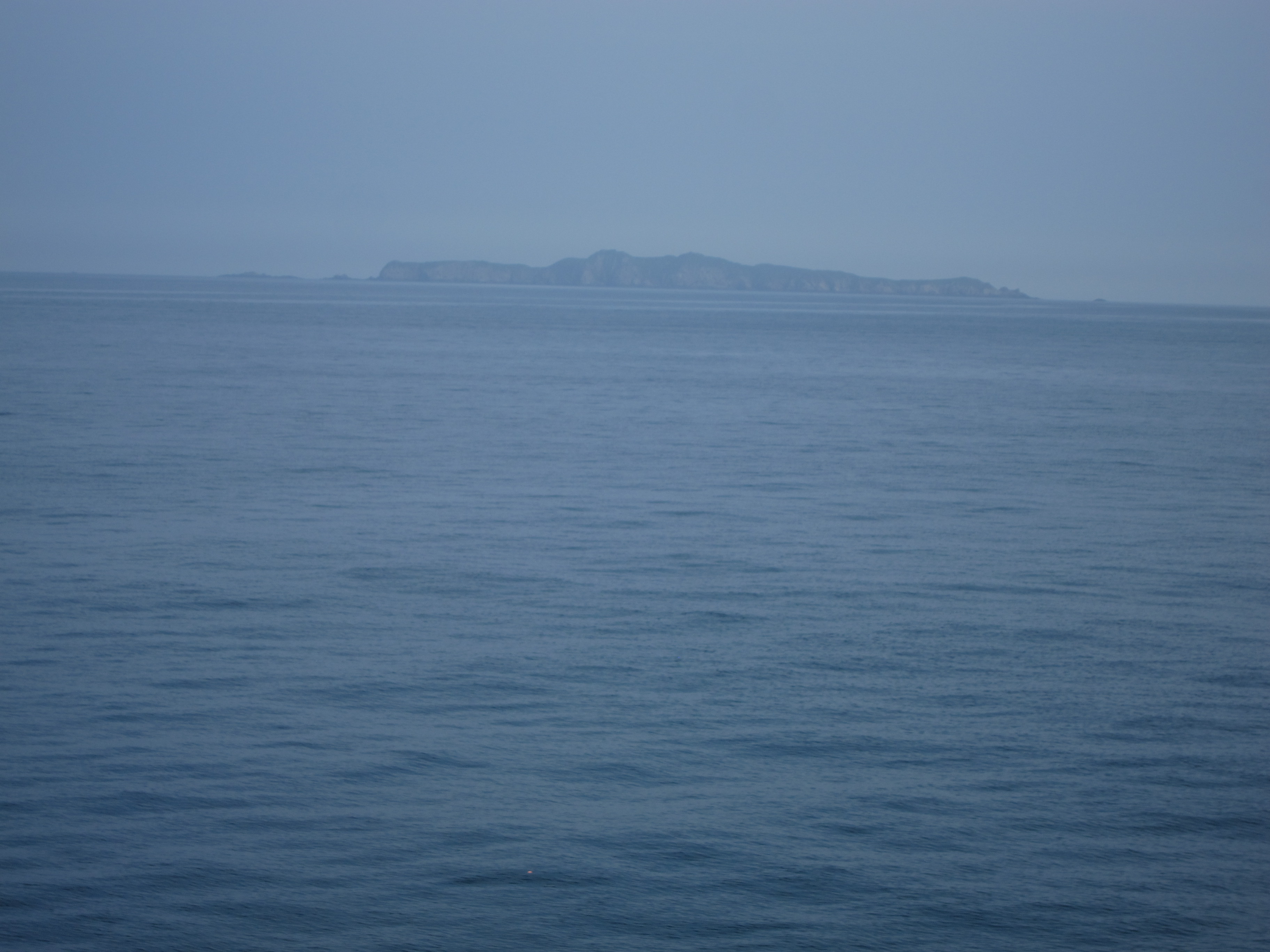
- Liang Island in the East China Sea

- Liang Island in Lienchiang County (the Matsu Islands)

Geography
- Location: northeast of Beigan Island, Beigan Township, Lienchiang County (the Matsu Islands), Fujian, Republic of China (Taiwan)
- Area: 0.35 km^{2} (0.14 sq mi)
- Length: 1,400 m (4600 ft)
- Width: 250 m (820 ft)

Administration
- Republic of China (Taiwan)
- Province: Fujian (streamlined)
- County: Lienchiang
- Rural Township: Beigan

Additional information
- Time zone: National Standard Time (UTC+8)

Liang Island (Larne Island) (Chinese: 亮島; pinyin: Liàng Dǎo; Wade–Giles: Liang^{4} Tao^{3}; lit. 'island that illuminates'; Foochow Romanized: Liông-dō̤, originally 橫山, Lang Tao 浪島) is an island located in the East China Sea in Beigan Township, Lienchiang County (the Matsu Islands), Fujian Province, Republic of China (Taiwan). The island is closed to the public. The island is located 26 kilometers (16 mi) from both Beigan Island and Dongyin Island and 19.25 kilometers (11.96 mi) from Kuishan Island in Haidao Township, Xiapu County, Ningde, Fujian, People's Republic of China (PRC).

== History ==
In a description of the island from 1843, there were three houses near the summit of Larne Island (Liang Island).

After 1949, Chinese Communist forces intermittently occupied the island.

Before dawn on July 15, 1951, Anti-Communist forces planted the flag of the ROC on the highest point of the island.

On March 17, 1965, a company of infantry was stationed on the island; the garrison has remained there to the present.

In 1966, then-Minister of National Defense Chiang Ching-kuo visited the island as part of an inspection and gave the island the name Liang Island (亮島), derived from the phrase 「島立天中，亮照大陸」(dǎo lì tiān zhōng, liàng zhào dàlù, 'the island stands in the center of the world, illuminating the mainland').

On the morning of September 9, 2005, President Chen Shui-bian visited Liang Island and other nearby islands.

In December 2011, the ~8,000 year old Liangdao Man skeleton was found on the island. In 2014, the mitochondrial DNA of the skeleton was found to belong to Haplogroup E, with two of the four mutations characteristic of the E1 subgroup. From this, Ko et al. infer that Haplogroup E arose 8,000 to 11,000 years ago on the north Fujian coast, traveled to Taiwan with Neolithic settlers 6,000 years ago, and thence spread to Maritime Southeast Asia with the Austronesian language dispersal. Soares et al. caution against overemphasizing a single sample, and maintain that a constant molecular clock implies the earlier date (and more southerly origin) remains more likely. Additionally, the skeleton is believed to belong to Haplogroup O-M119, specifically under subclade O-CTS5726.

At 8 AM on August 16, 2019, the four man crew of a Chinese fishing ship was arrested in the waters off Liang Island.

== Geography ==
Bays of Liang Island include Wujin-ao Bay (吾進澳), Liang-ao Bay (良澳), Sheng-ao Bay (聖澳) and Lian-ao Bay (連澳). Liang Island's Mount Qingmian (Mount Cingmian; 清勉山) reaches 91 m (299 ft) above sea level. The island's main port is Baisheng Port (百勝港).

The island is about 1,400 m (4,600 ft) long and 250 m (820 ft) wide, reaching 50 m (160 ft) wide at the narrowest point. Strong winds during the winter make walking difficult.

== Economy ==
Before 1965, fishermen would sometimes live on the island during the summer and leave when autumn started.

== Gallery ==
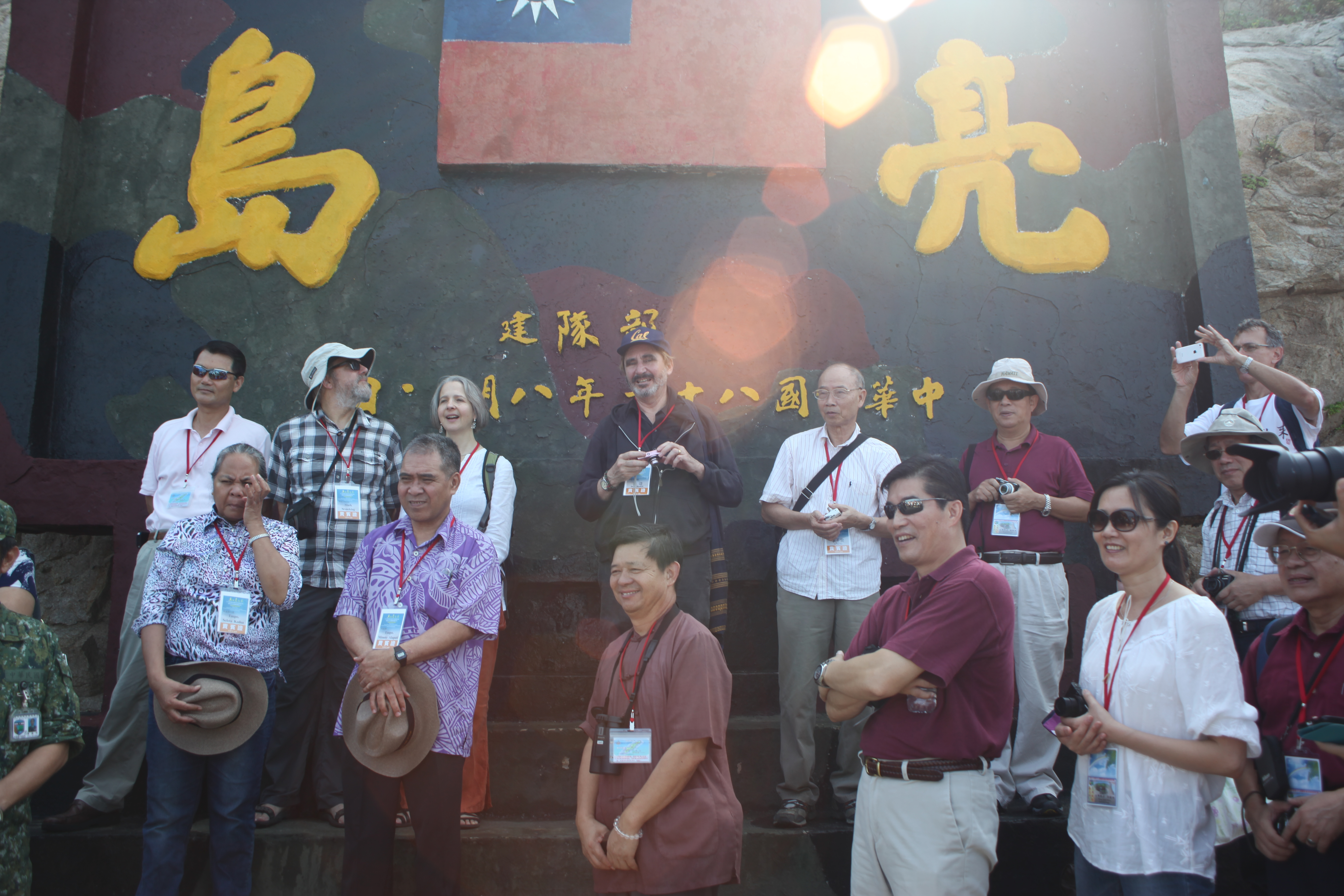
Liang Island (2014)

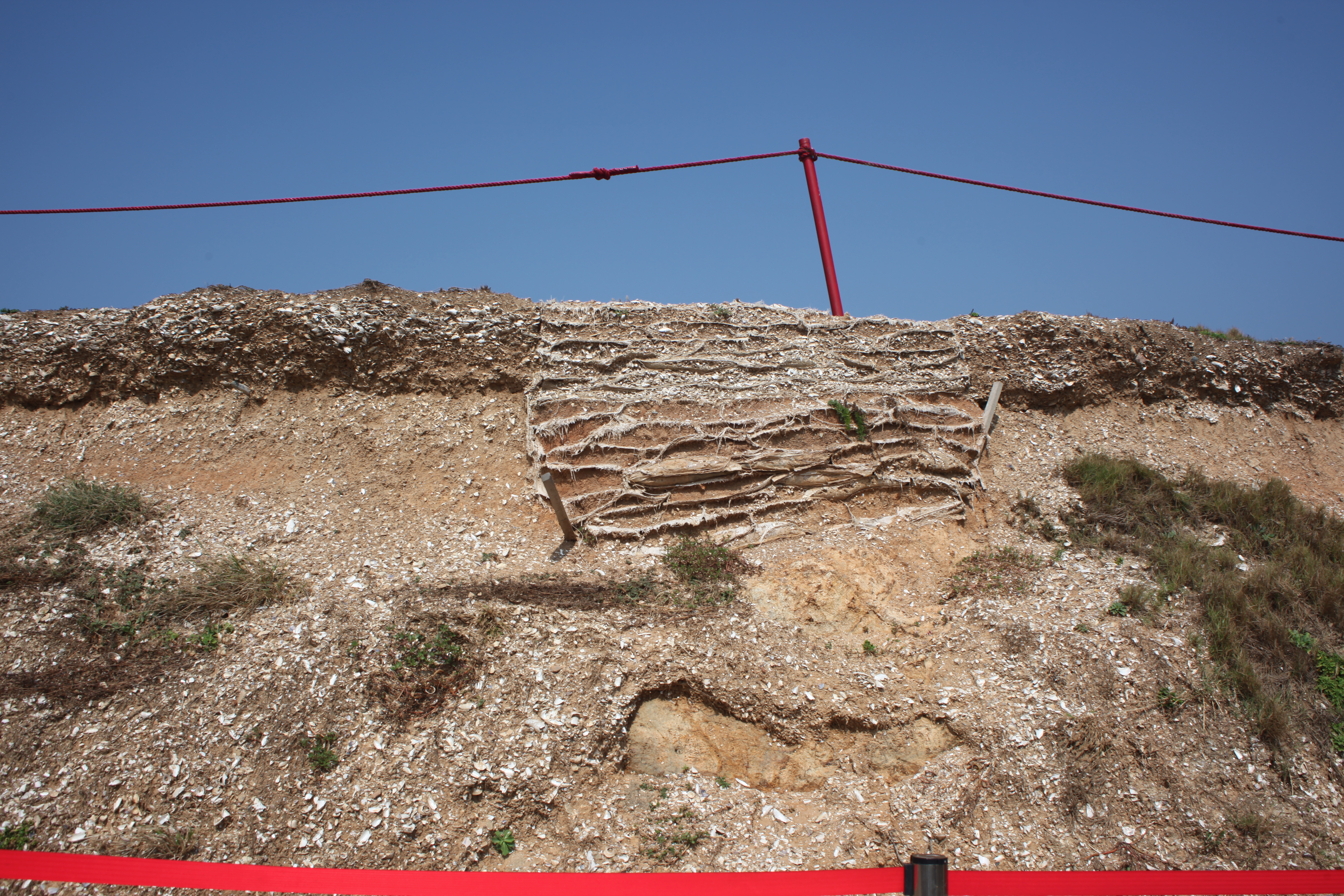
Site of the Discovery of the Prehistoric Human Skeleton on Liang Island (2014)

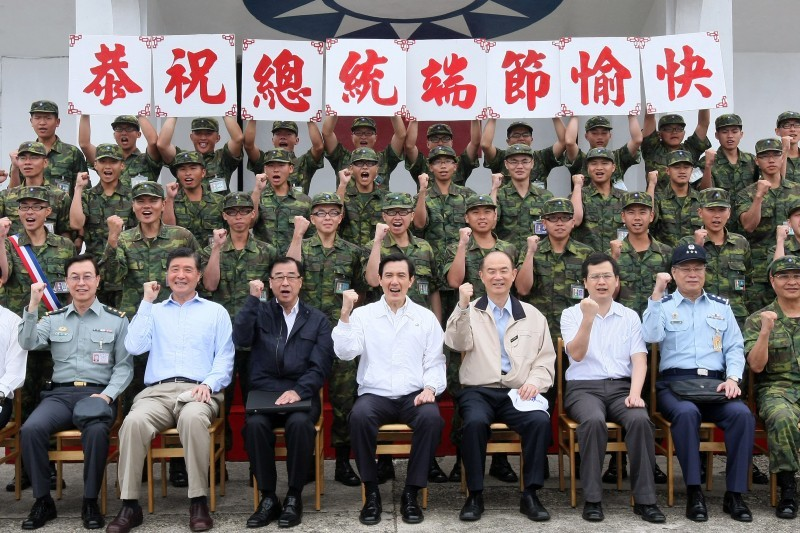
President Ma Ying-jeou visits Liang Island (2010)

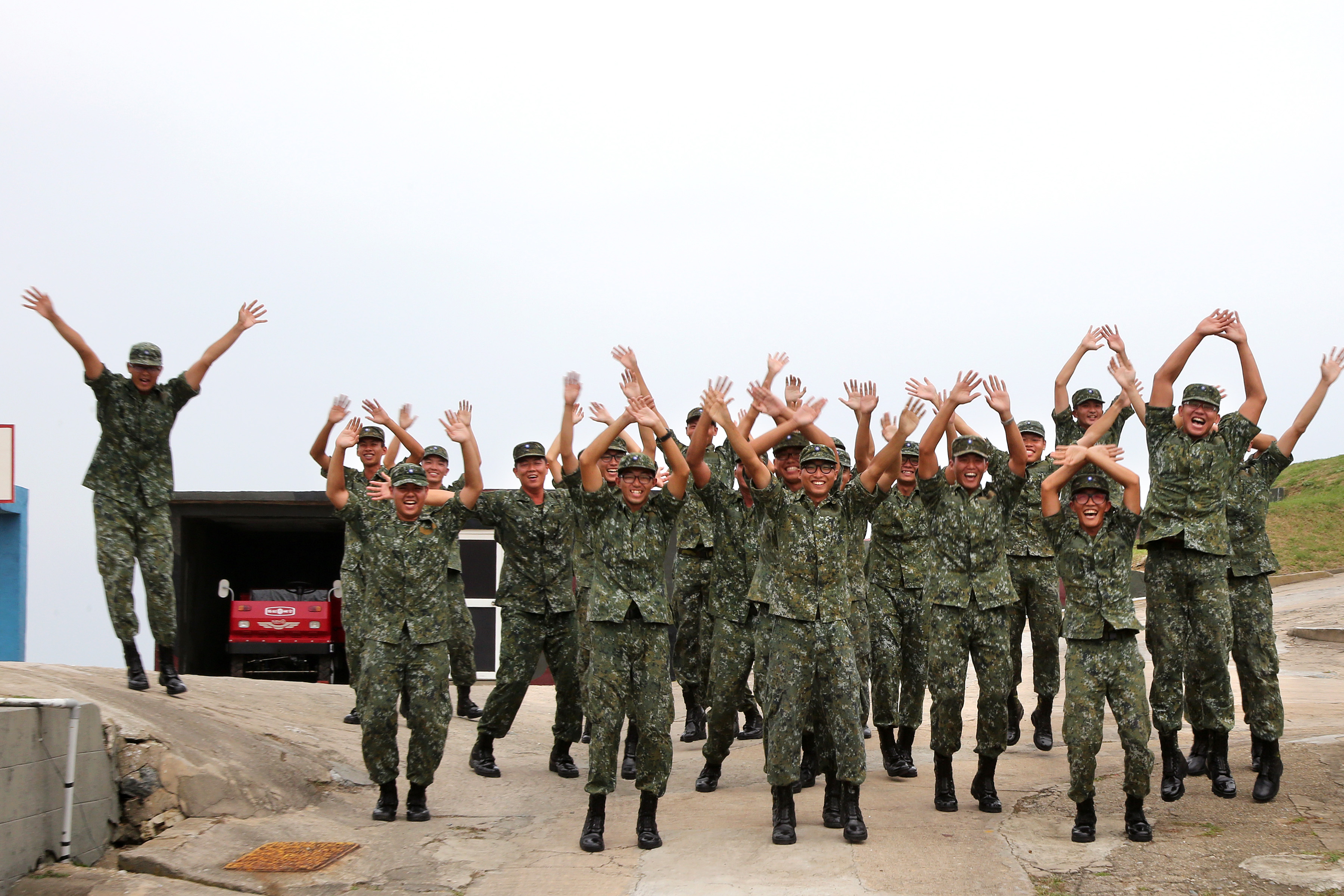
Soldiers at Liang Island (2015)

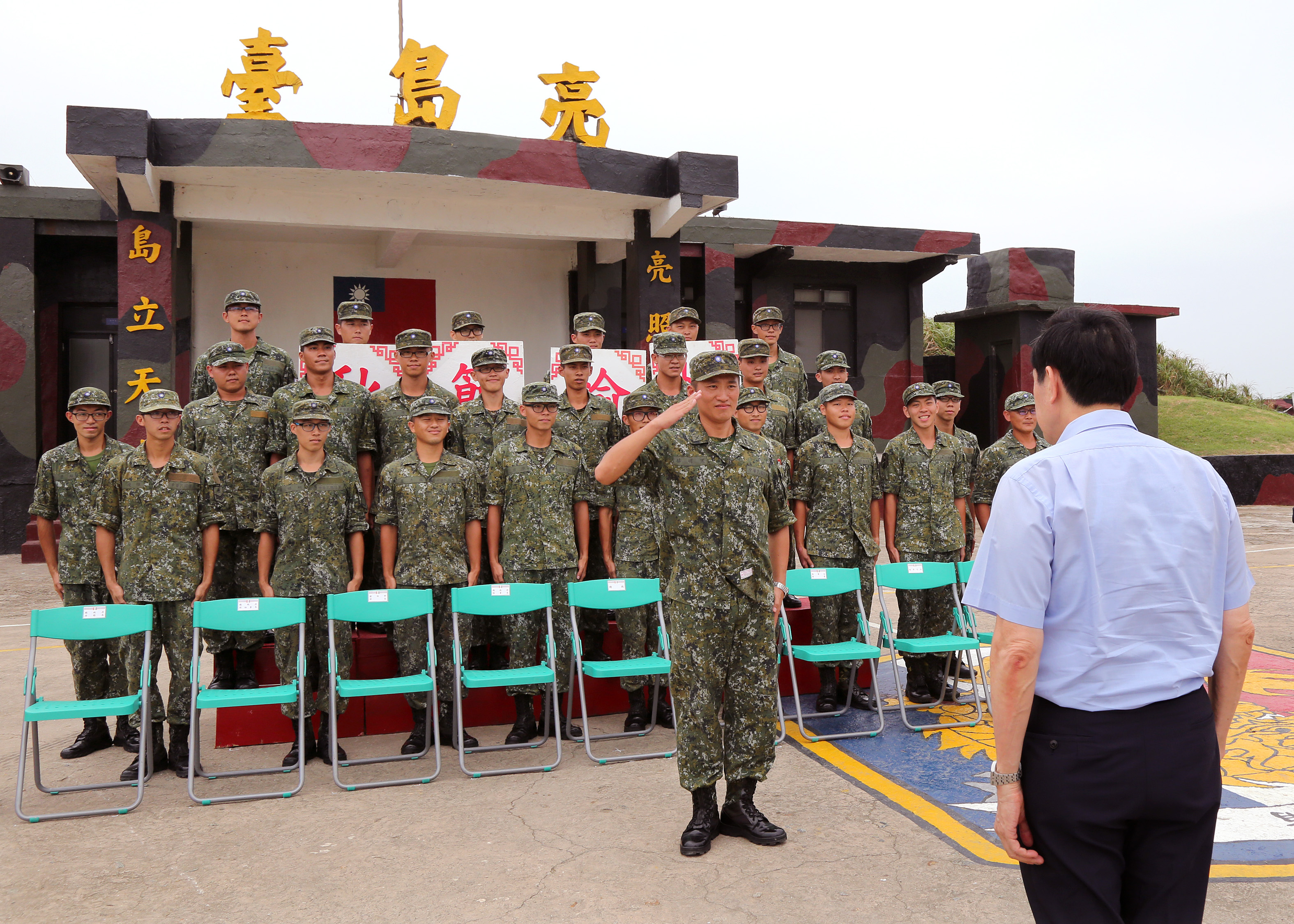
President Ma Ying-jeou visits Liang Island (2015)

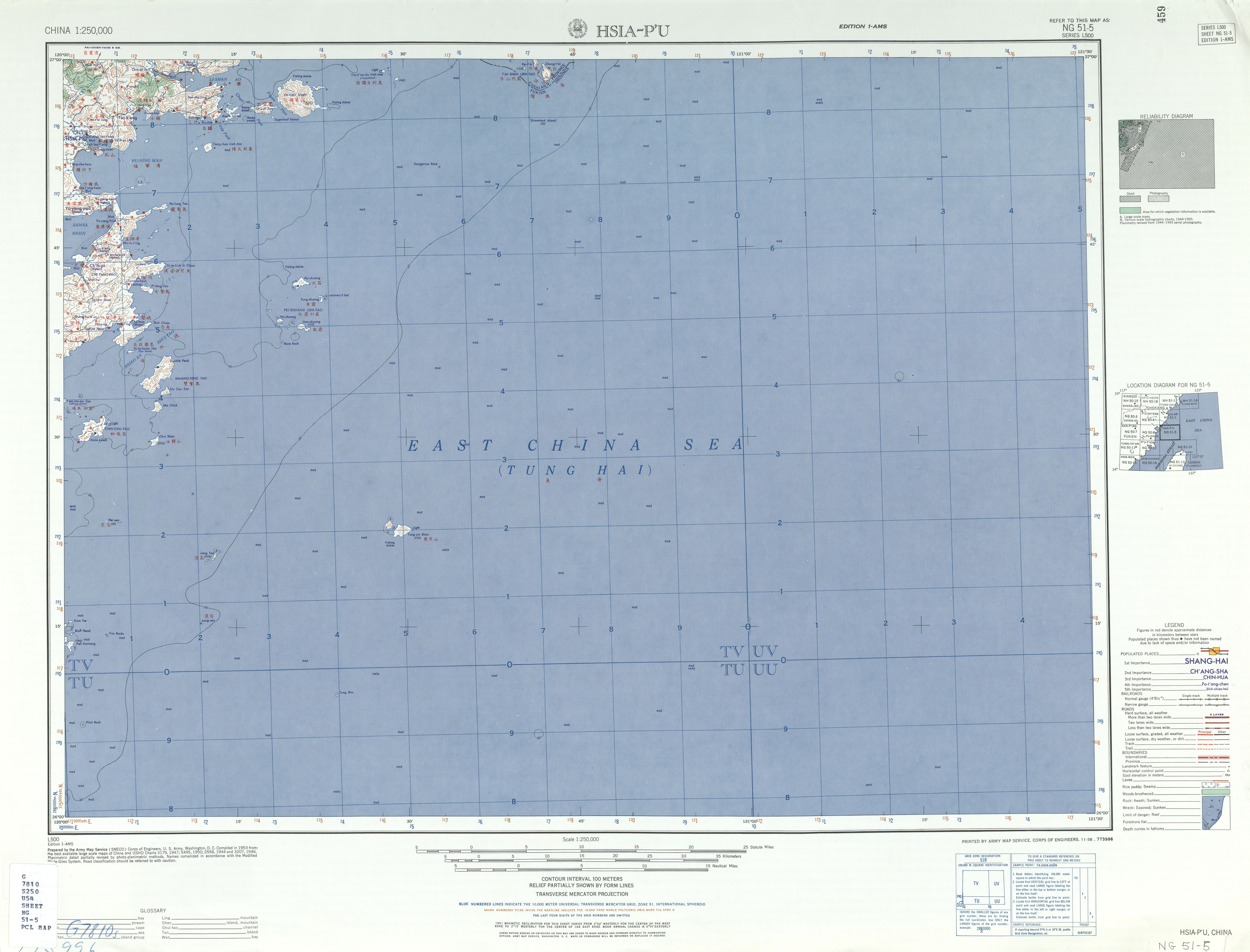
Map including Liang Island (labeled Lang Tao 浪島) (AMS, 1953)

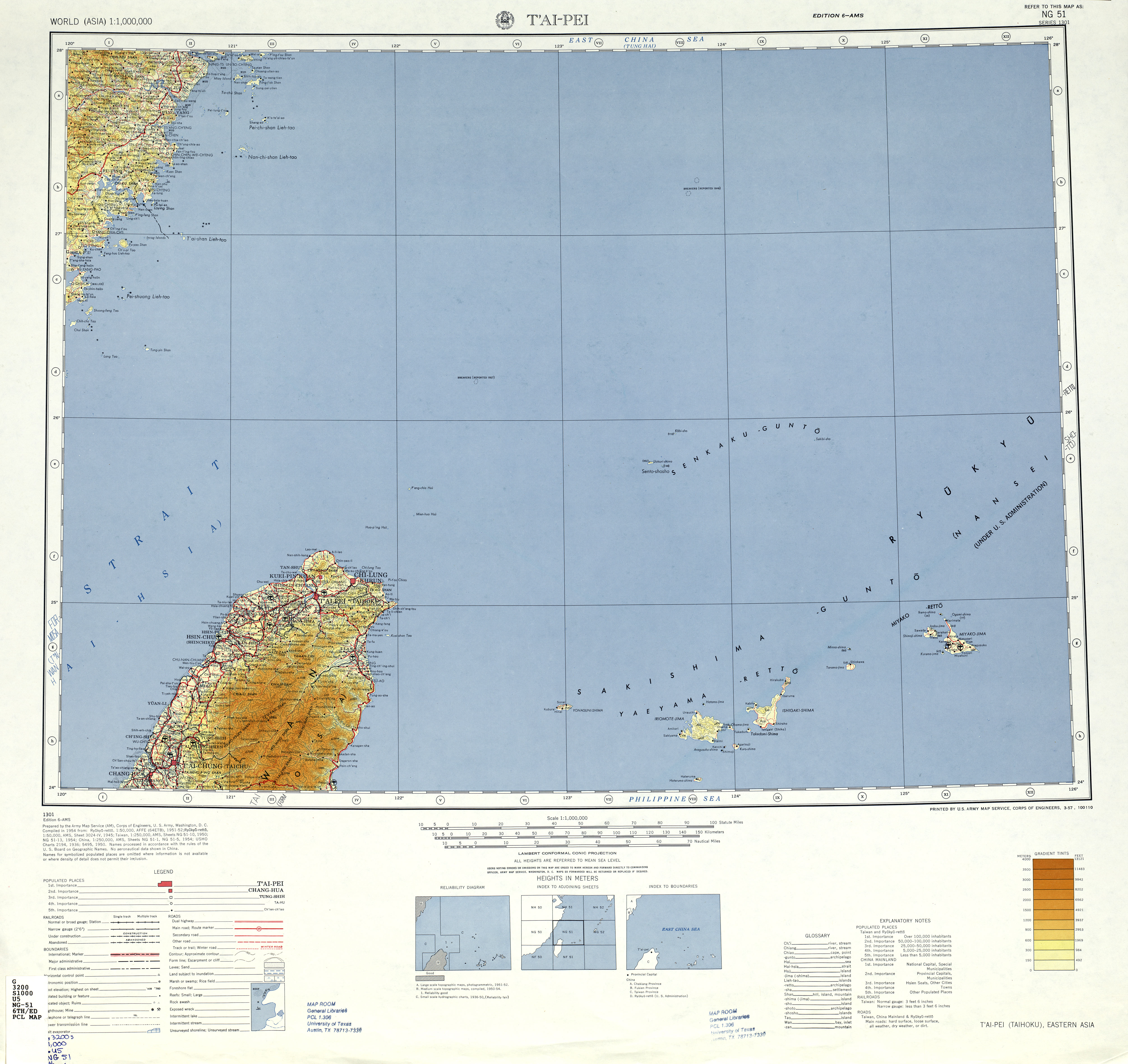
Map including Liang Island (labeled as Lang Tao) from the International Map of the World (AMS, 1954)

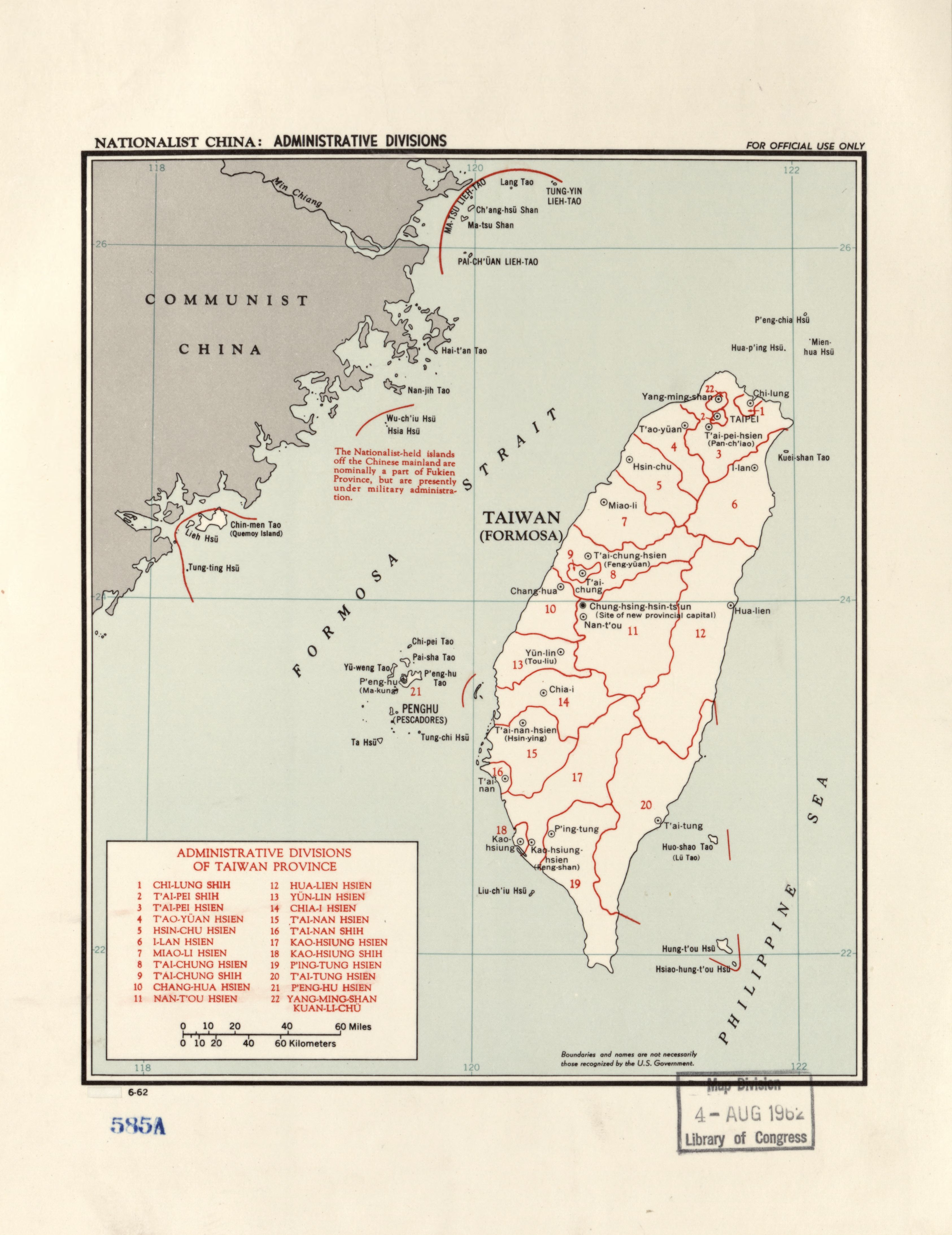
Map including Liang Island (labeled as Lang Tao)
"The Nationalist-held islands off the Chinese mainland are nominally a part of Fukien Province, but are presently under military administration." (1962)

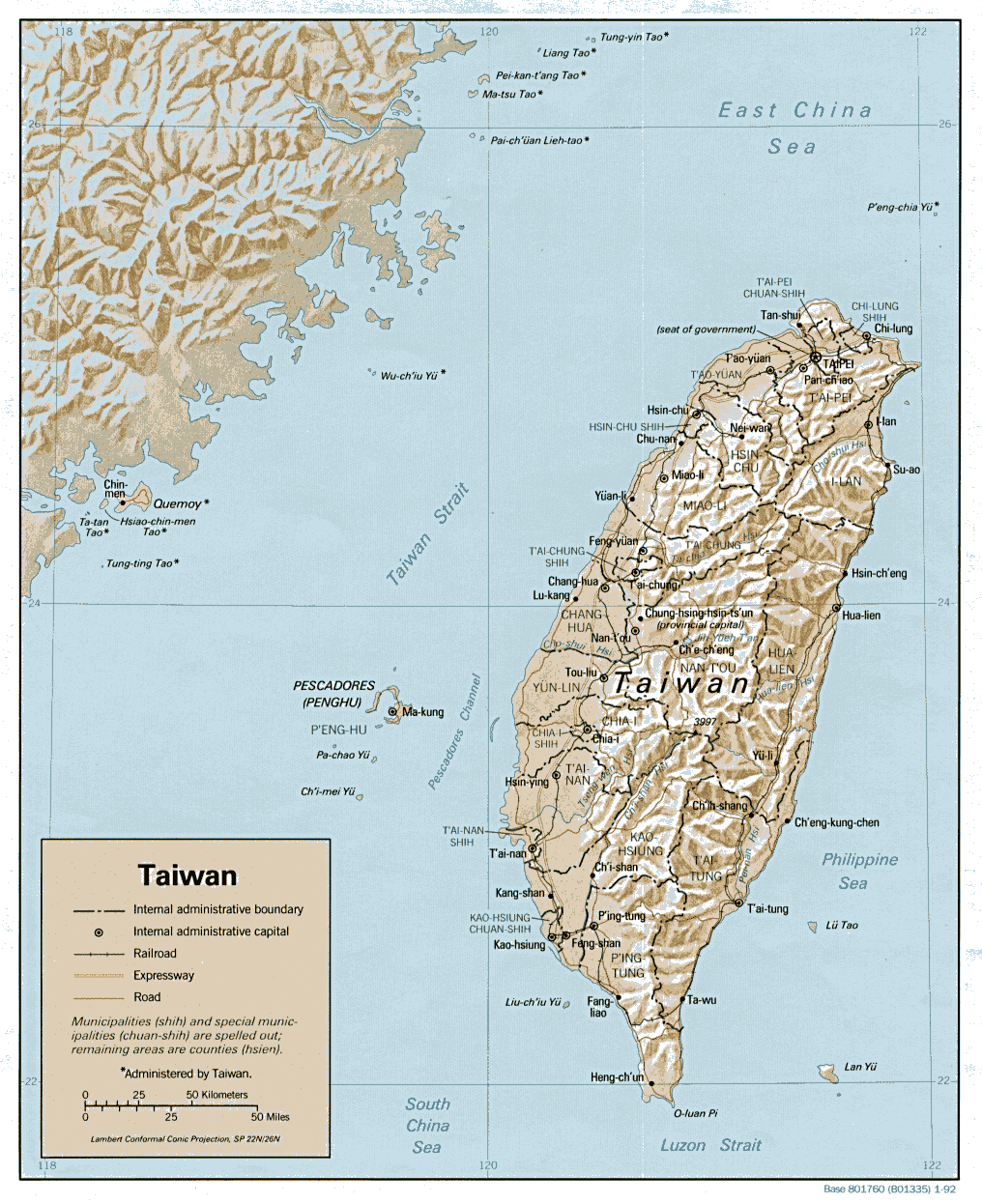
Map including Liang Island (labeled as Liang Tao)
"Administered by Taiwan." (1992)

== See also ==
- Prehistory of Taiwan
- List of islands in the East China Sea
- List of islands of Taiwan
- 亮島之歌 (in Chinese) ('Liang Island Song')
