= Shihou Township =

Shihou Township 石后乡
- Township
- Location in Fujian Shihou Township (China)
- Coordinates: 26°42′17″N 119°25′11″E
- Country: People's Republic of China
- Province: Fujian
- Prefecture-level city: Ningde
- District: Jiaocheng District
- Village-level divisions: 14 villages
- Time zone: UTC+8 (China Standard)

Shihou Township (simplified Chinese: 石后乡; traditional Chinese: 石後鄉; pinyin: Shíhòu Xiāng) is a township of Jiaocheng District, Ningde in northeastern Fujian province, China. As of 2023, it has 14 villages under its administration:

- Chenban Village (陈坂村)
- Daling Village (大岭村)
- Dangyang Village (当洋村)
- Dingyang Village (定洋村)
- Guangrong Village (光荣村)
- Linxiayang Village (林下洋村)
- Damuqian Village (大墓前村)
- Qinhou Village (芹后村)
- Sanwang Village (三望村)
- Shangzhuyang Village (上竹洋村)
- Shicuo Village (石厝村)
- Xiazhuyang Village (下竹洋村)
- Xiaoji Village (小际村)
- Xiaoling Village (小岭村)

== See also ==
- List of township-level divisions of Fujian
