= Mount Taimu =

Mountain in Ningde, Fujian, China

- Immortal Mountain on the Sea
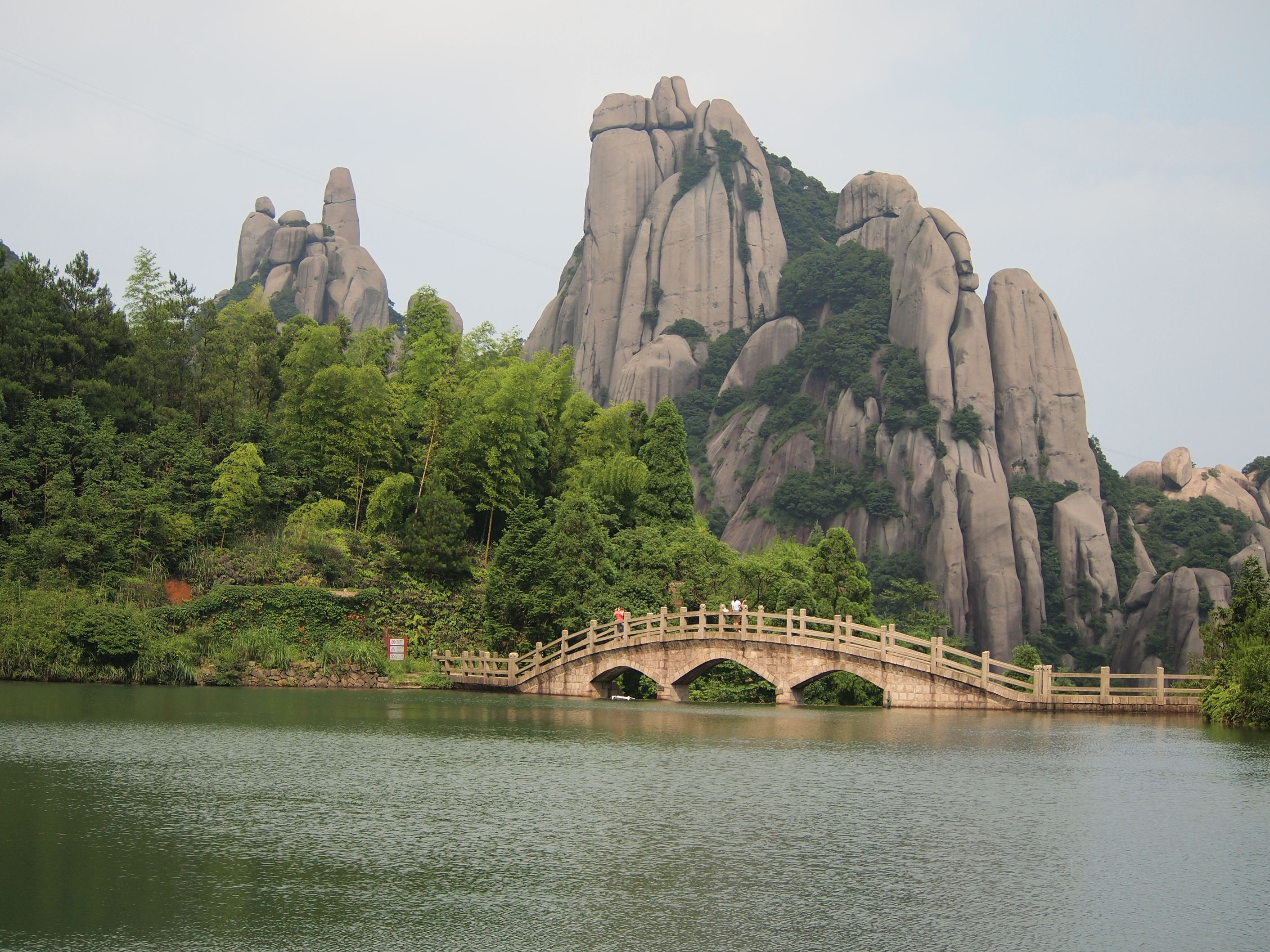

Highest point
- Elevation: 900.07 m (2,953.0 ft)
- Coordinates: 27°08′03″N 120°09′51″E

Geography
- Location within Fujian
- Location: Ningde, Fujian, China

Mount Taimu (Chinese: 太姥山) is a mountain in Ningde, Fujian, China. It is located 46km south of the county-level city of Fuding, 150km away from Wenzhou in the north, and 250km away from Fuzhou in the south.

The mountain overlooks Yandang Mountain in the north and Wuyi Mountain in the west, with plenty of Taoist and Buddhist temples and sites.

== Mythology ==
In Chinese mythology, the mountain was considered a gathering point for deities from the East China Sea.

== Tourism ==
Since 2013, it has been classified as a AAAAA scenic area by the China National Tourism Administration. The mountain and its surroundings contain scenic waterfalls, caves, temples, and hills.
