= South Zhongzhou Road =

Road in Beijing, China

South Zhongzhou Road (simplified Chinese: 南中轴路; traditional Chinese: 南中軸路; pinyin: Nán Zhōngzhóu Lù) is a road lying on the central axis of Beijing. It runs from Yongdingmen Bridge on the southern 2nd Ring Road through to the southern 5th Ring Road. Construction was completed in October 2004.

There is a wide express bus lane on the road, the first in Beijing.

South Zhongzhou Road forms the start of China National Highway 104, which diverts southeast after the intersection with the 4th Ring Road.
