= Jiaocheng, Ningde =

Jiaocheng 蕉城区
- District
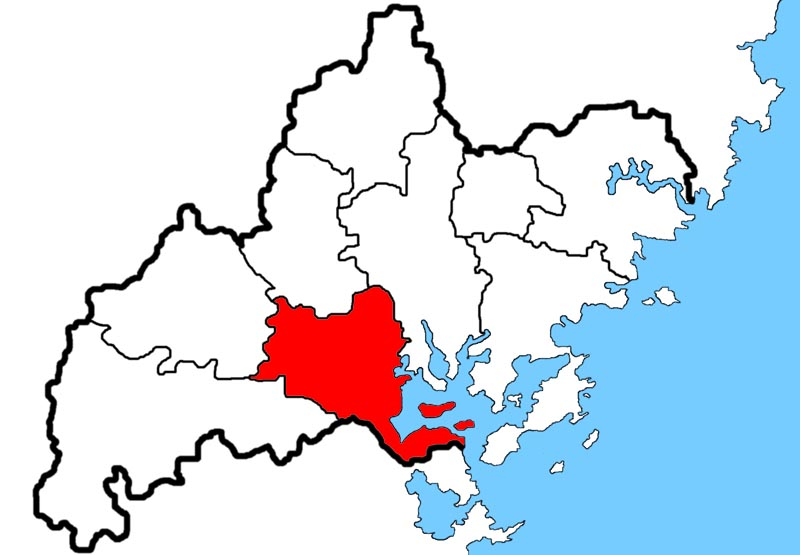
- Location in Ningde

- Location in Fujian
- Coordinates: 26°39′42″N 119°31′23″E
- Country: People's Republic of China
- Province: Fujian
- Prefecture-level city: Ningde

Area
  - Total: 1,429 km^{2} (552 sq mi)

Population (2020 census)
  - Total: 623,840
  - Density: 436.6/km^{2} (1,131/sq mi)
- Time zone: UTC+8 (China Standard)

Jiaocheng (Chinese: 蕉城区; pinyin: Jiāochéng; Foochow Romanized: Ciĕu-siàng) is a district of Ningde, Fujian province, People's Republic of China. The district seats the municipality's executive, legislature and judiciary, together with its Communist Party and Public Security Bureau.

== Situation ==
Jiaocheng is bordered by Xiapu and Pingnan counties to the east and west, Zhouning County and Fu'an City to the north, and to the south by Fuzhou municipality's Gutian and Luoyuan counties. A large deepwater bay, Sanduao (三都澳) (Santuao) gives access to the East China Sea.

== Administration ==
The district oversees two subdistricts (街道; Jiēdào), one Development zone (开发区; kāifā qū), ten towns (镇; zhèn) and four townships (乡; xiāng), of which one is an ethnic township designated for the native She people.

=== Subdistricts ===
- Jiaonan Subdistrict (蕉南街道)
- Jiaobei Subdistrict (蕉北街道)

=== Development zones ===
- Dongqiao (东侨开发区)

=== Towns ===
- Chengnan (城南镇)
- Zhangwan (漳湾镇)
- Qidu (七都镇)
- Badu (八都镇)
- Jiudu (九都镇)
- Feiluan (飞鸾镇)
- Sandu (三都镇)
- Chixi (赤溪镇)
- Huotong (霍童镇)
- Yangzhong (洋中镇)
- Hubei (虎贝镇)

=== Townships ===
- Hongkou Township (洪口乡)
- Shihou Township (石后乡)
- Jinhan She Ethnic Township (金涵畲族乡)

== Transportation ==
Both subdistricts, the Ethnic Township and the towns of Feiluan, Chengnan, Qidu and Badu lie on National Route 104, connecting south to Fengshan and north to Fu'an.
