= Tongcheng Subdistrict, Fuding =

Coordinates: 27.3225°N 120.2132°E

Tongcheng Subdistrict 桐城街道
- Subdistrict
- Interactive map of Tongcheng Subdistrict
- Country: People's Republic of China
- Province: Fujian
- Prefecture-level city: Ningde
- County-level city: Fuding
- Time zone: UTC+8 (China Standard Time)

Tongcheng (Chinese: 桐城街道; pinyin: Tóngchéng Jiēdào) is a subdistrict of the city of Fuding, Fujian, People's Republic of China.

== See also ==
- List of township-level divisions of Fujian
