= Xialou Village =

Xialou 下楼村
- Village
- Location in Fujian
- Coordinates: 23°59′10″N 117°19′49″E
- Country: People's Republic of China
- Province: Fujian
- Prefecture-level city: Zhangzhou
- County: Yunxiao
- Town: Huotian
- Time zone: UTC+8 (China Standard)
- Postal code: 363302

Xialou Village (simplified Chinese: 下楼村; traditional Chinese: 下樓村; pinyin: Xiàlóu Cūn) is an administrative village under the jurisdiction of the town of Huotian, Yunxiao County, Zhangzhou, Fujian Province, China. It is located in the southern part of Huotian. The main surname in the town is "Wu". Xialou spans an area of 2,739.35 acres, and is home to about 1,500 people. The village's postal code is 363302, and cars in the village have a registration plate of "Min E" .

== History ==
Human activity in the area can be traced back 10,000 years. Prior to its conquest, the area belonged to the Minyue. The area was incorporated in the Qin dynasty as part of Minzhong Commandery.

In 592 CE, the area was reorganized as Longxi County. Soon, Longxi County was revoked, and the area was incorporated into Nan'an County, which was also revoked shortly after. It was not until the middle of Tang dynasty, in 686 CE, that the area of Zhangzhou was re-organized as its own administrative unit, as part of Jianzhou. The area was re-organized in 700 CE, 716 CE, and 786 CE.

In 886 CE, brothers Wang Chao and Wang Xu incited a peasant rebellion in Quanzhou and briefly occupied the territory.

After the collapse of the Tang dynasty, Wang Shenzhi took over, and ruled the area as part of the Min Kingdom, up until 947 CE.

Afterwards, the area was incorporated as part of the Song dynasty, then the Yuan dynasty, and later as part of the Ming dynasty.

In 1734, the area was merged into Tingzhou Prefecture.

In 1913, the Republican government created Yunxiao County as part of a broad reorganizing which created Tingzhang Circuit.

In 1933, the area was reorganized as Longting Province.

The area was taken by the People's Liberation Army on September 26, 1949, with communist forces reorganizing the area. The area was reorganized again in 1950, 1952, 1954, 1955, 1956, 1957, and in February 1958.

In August 1958, previous divisions of the area were overhauled, and the area was re-organized as communes.

In November 1984, the commune system was abolished, and the area was re-organized. This change created the then-township of Huotian, which was re-designated in 1992.

== Geography ==
The area of the village is about 2739.35 mu, and the forest coverage is 65%, the cultivated land is 674.84 mu, and the forest land is 276.56 mu. The village is largely hilly.

The Zhang River, formerly known as the Yunxiao River, runs through the village.

== Demographics ==
Xialou Village has a population about 1,500 people, which is mainly Han in ethnicity. There village is home to about 500 households. The Minnan Dialect is spoken in the village.

== Economy ==
The local economy is largely dependent on agriculture. The main crops of the village are jujubes and longans. The average monthly income of the town's farmers is approximately 5,000 Yuan.
