= Fuding =

Fuding 福鼎市 Futing
- County-level city
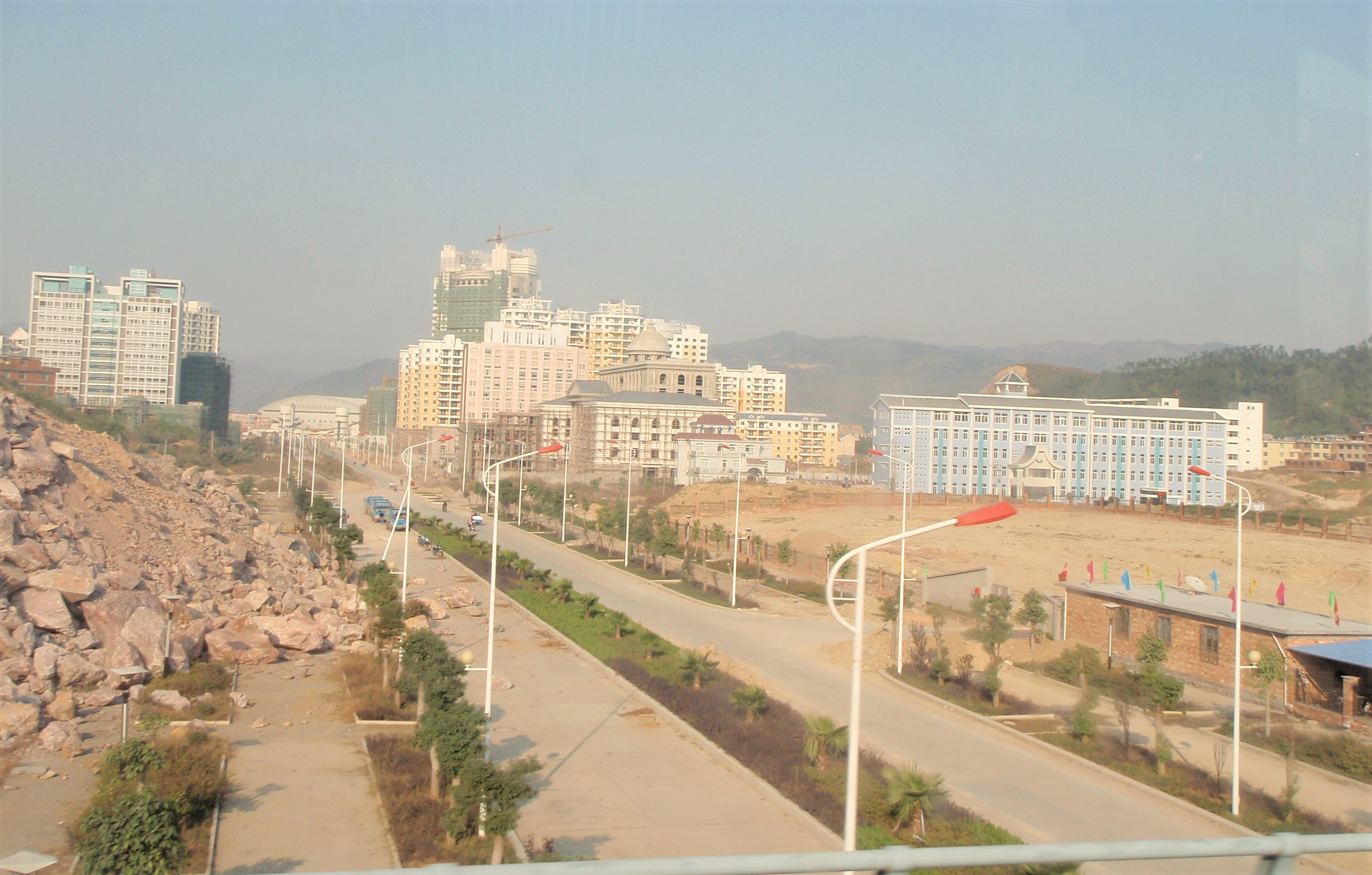

- Location in Fujian
- Coordinates: 27°12′N 120°12′E
- Country: People's Republic of China
- Province: Fujian
- Prefecture-level city: Ningde

Area
  - Total: 1,484 km^{2} (573 sq mi)

Population (2020 census)
  - Total: 553,132
  - Density: 372.7/km^{2} (965.4/sq mi)
- Time zone: UTC+8 (China Standard)

Fuding (Note: Pronunciation:) (Chinese: 福鼎市; pinyin: Fúdǐng Shì) is a county-level city in northeastern Ningde, Fujian Province, China, located on Fujian's border with Zhejiang Province.

== History ==
Fuding county was established during the Qing Dynasty in 1739 AD.

On December 15, 1950, the Matsu Administrative Office (馬祖行政公署) of Fujian Province, Republic of China was established including modern-day Lienchiang County (the Matsu Islands), ROC (Taiwan) as well as islands in present-day Haidao Township, Xiapu County and Taishan (台山) in Fuding's Shacheng.

== Administrative ==
Fuding was promoted to county-level city status in 1995. With a population of 553,132 in 2020. The city oversees 3 street committees, 1 development zone, 10 towns and 3 townships, of which one is zoned Affirmative action-like for the city's native She people.

== Geography ==
The city is mountainous and has a good deal of seacoast. Fu'an City lies to the west and Xiapu County to the south. North and east lie counties in Wenzhou, Zhejiang province. Territorial area is 1,526 square kilometres (589 sq mi), or 14,957.7 square kilometres (5,775.2 sq mi) when including sea area.

=== Subdistricts ===
Chinese: 街道; pinyin: Jiēdào

- Shanqian (山前街道)
- Tongshan (桐山街道)
- Tongcheng (桐城街道)

=== Development area ===
- Long'an Development Area (龙安开发区)

=== Towns ===
Chinese: 镇; pinyin: zhèn

- Guanling (贯岭镇)
- Panxi (磻溪镇)
- Yushan (嵛山镇)
- Bailin (白琳镇)
- Shacheng (沙埕镇)
- Guanyang (管阳镇)
- Dianxia (店下镇)
- Diantou (点头镇)
- Qinyu (秦屿镇)
- Qianqi (前岐镇)

=== Townships ===
Chinese: 乡; pinyin: xiāng

- Jiayang (佳阳乡)
- Dieshi (叠石乡)

=== Ethnic Townships ===
Chinese: 民族乡; pinyin: mínzú xiāng

- Xiamen She (硖门畲族乡)

== Climate ==
Climate data for Fuding, elevation 36 m (118 ft), (1991–2020 normals, extremes 1981–present)
Month	Jan	Feb	Mar	Apr	May	Jun	Jul	Aug	Sep	Oct	Nov	Dec	Year
Record high °C (°F)	25.3 (77.5)	29.8 (85.6)	31.9 (89.4)	32.8 (91.0)	36.3 (97.3)	39.0 (102.2)	40.6 (105.1)	38.4 (101.1)	39.0 (102.2)	36.1 (97.0)	30.8 (87.4)	26.6 (79.9)	40.6 (105.1)
Mean daily maximum °C (°F)	13.9 (57.0)	15.0 (59.0)	17.8 (64.0)	22.8 (73.0)	26.8 (80.2)	29.9 (85.8)	33.5 (92.3)	33.2 (91.8)	30.4 (86.7)	26.2 (79.2)	21.4 (70.5)	16.5 (61.7)	24.0 (75.1)
Daily mean °C (°F)	9.3 (48.7)	10.2 (50.4)	12.9 (55.2)	17.6 (63.7)	22.1 (71.8)	25.6 (78.1)	28.7 (83.7)	28.4 (83.1)	25.7 (78.3)	21.3 (70.3)	16.7 (62.1)	11.5 (52.7)	19.2 (66.5)
Mean daily minimum °C (°F)	6.2 (43.2)	7.1 (44.8)	9.7 (49.5)	14.1 (57.4)	18.7 (65.7)	22.5 (72.5)	25.2 (77.4)	25.0 (77.0)	22.4 (72.3)	17.7 (63.9)	13.3 (55.9)	8.1 (46.6)	15.8 (60.5)
Record low °C (°F)	−3.4 (25.9)	−2.9 (26.8)	−2.3 (27.9)	4.3 (39.7)	9.7 (49.5)	13.4 (56.1)	19.3 (66.7)	20.5 (68.9)	13.9 (57.0)	6.1 (43.0)	0.7 (33.3)	−5.2 (22.6)	−5.2 (22.6)
Average precipitation mm (inches)	60.2 (2.37)	81.8 (3.22)	146.4 (5.76)	138.8 (5.46)	176.9 (6.96)	273.7 (10.78)	193.5 (7.62)	274.9 (10.82)	177.8 (7.00)	73.2 (2.88)	67.2 (2.65)	55.7 (2.19)	1,720.1 (67.71)
Average precipitation days (≥ 0.1 mm)	12.1	13.0	17.1	16.3	17.1	17.9	12.9	16.1	12.8	8.1	10.1	10.3	163.8
Average snowy days	0.6	0.9	0.2	0	0	0	0	0	0	0	0	0.3	2
Average relative humidity (%)	76	77	78	77	78	82	78	78	76	72	74	73	77
Mean monthly sunshine hours	97.6	90.1	101.5	121.4	127.2	127.8	220.4	199.2	161.1	159.5	113.9	115.8	1,635.5
Percentage possible sunshine	30	28	27	31	31	31	52	49	44	45	35	36	37
Source: China Meteorological Administration All-time Oct extreme

== Culture ==
The region mostly speaks Eastern Min natively. There is a Puxian Min (Hinghwa) speaking community in Fuding.

== Transport ==
Fuding City is located in the strategic region between northeast Fujian and southern Zhejiang provinces. The main road No. 104 pass through Fuding City. Fuding City is also home to the deep sea port Shacheng. The port enables large ships to come to Shacheng port which in turn leads to increase economic activity and trade.

The opening of the full-line of Wenfu High Speed Railway on September 28, 2009, improved the transportation conditions. Wenfu and Yongtaiwen High Speed Railway cut the travel time of Fuding–Fuzhou to 1.5h, Fuding–Wenzhou to 0.5h and Fuding–Shanghai to 5h.

A ferry service operates across Shacheng Bay, connecting the somewhat isolated town of Shacheng to the Long'an Development Area (the port for Dianxia Town).

With the construction of Taimu International Airport in future, Fuding will be more and more open to the outside world.

== Attractions ==
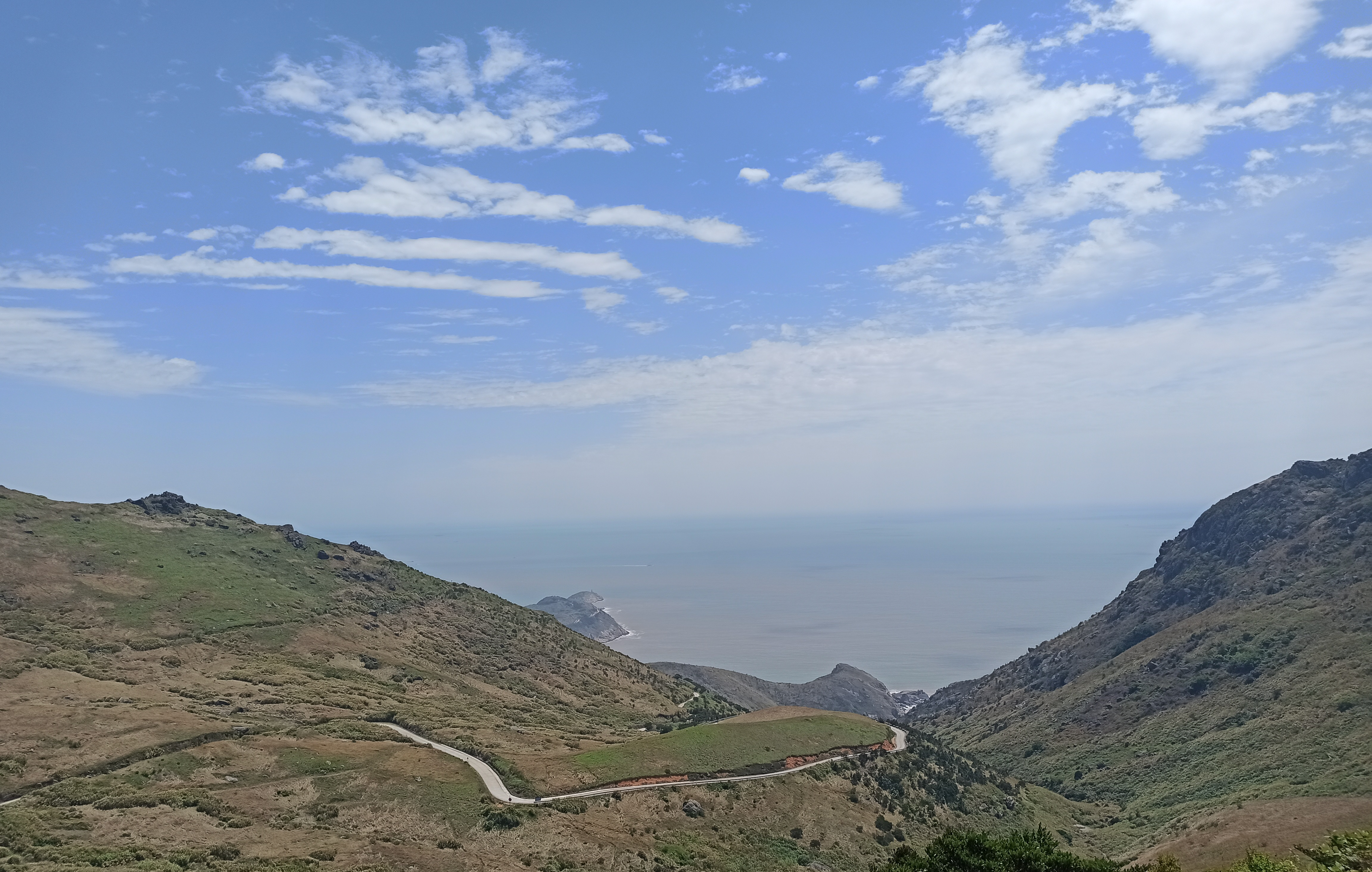
Dayushan Island

=== Taimu Mountain ===
The Taimu Mountain is one of the more famous tourist spots. Known as the "wonderland on the sea", it sports many high and steep mountains, rock formations, caves, a foggy climate, and additional rivers and parks.

=== Dayushan Island ===
Dayushan Island is a small tourist island that has rolling grassland and beautiful views of hills and lakes. It is sometimes referred to as the "Heavenly Mountain in South China".
