= Zherong =

Zherong County 柘荣县
- County
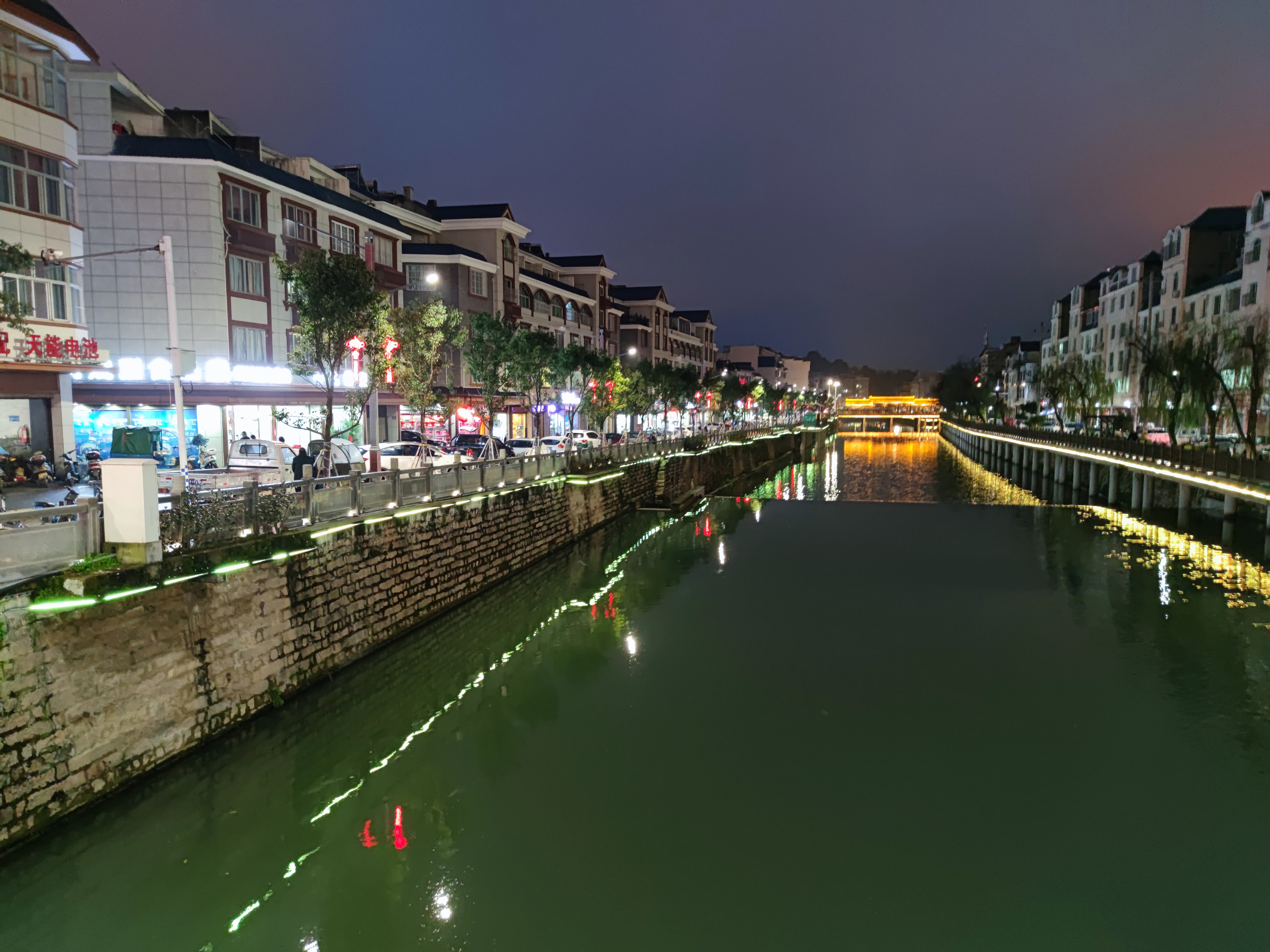

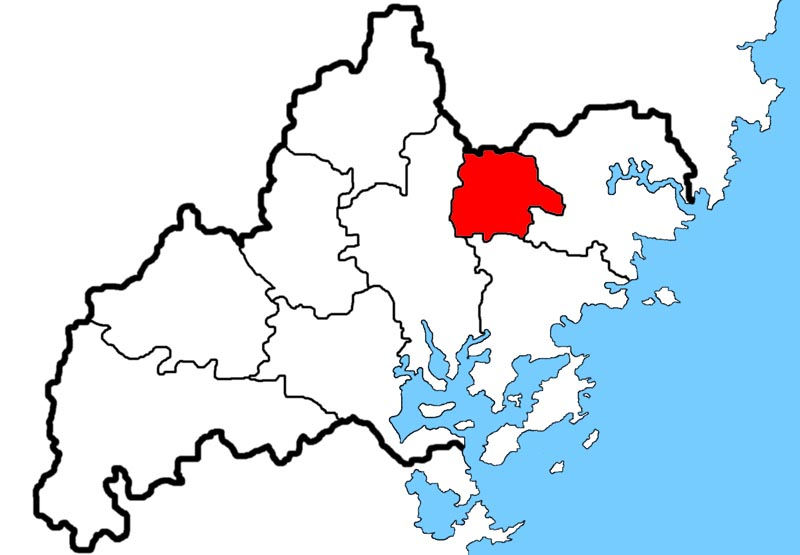
- Zherong in Ningde

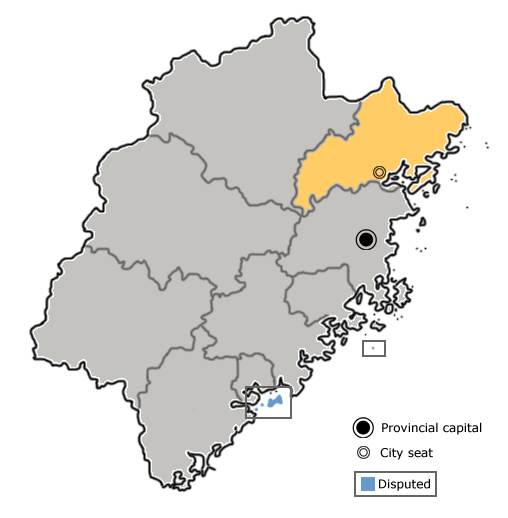
- Ningde in Fujian
- Coordinates: 27°14′02″N 119°54′02″E
- Country: People's Republic of China
- Province: Fujian
- Prefecture-level city: Ningde

Area
  - Total: 548.0 km^{2} (211.6 sq mi)

Population (2020)
  - Total: 92,989
  - Density: 169.7/km^{2} (439.5/sq mi)
- Time zone: UTC+8 (China Standard)

Zherong County (simplified Chinese: 柘荣县; traditional Chinese: 柘榮縣; pinyin: Zhèróng Xiàn; Foochow Romanized: Ciá-ìng-gâing) is a county in the northeast of Fujian province, People's Republic of China, bordering Zhejiang province to the north. It is under the administration of the prefecture-level city of Ningde.

== Administrative divisions ==
Towns:

- Shuangcheng (双城镇), Fuxi (富溪镇)

Townships:

- Chengjiao Township (城郊乡), Zhayang Township (乍洋乡), Dongyuan Township (东源乡), Zhaizhong Township (宅中乡), Huangbai Township (黄柏乡), Chuping Township (楮坪乡), Yingshan Township (英山乡)

== Climate ==
Climate data for Zherong, elevation 684 m (2,244 ft), (1991–2020 normals, extremes 1981–present)
Month	Jan	Feb	Mar	Apr	May	Jun	Jul	Aug	Sep	Oct	Nov	Dec	Year
Record high °C (°F)	23.1 (73.6)	27.4 (81.3)	30.6 (87.1)	32.0 (89.6)	33.3 (91.9)	34.5 (94.1)	36.0 (96.8)	35.0 (95.0)	34.8 (94.6)	32.1 (89.8)	30.9 (87.6)	25.3 (77.5)	36.0 (96.8)
Mean daily maximum °C (°F)	11.5 (52.7)	13.0 (55.4)	16.2 (61.2)	21.2 (70.2)	24.7 (76.5)	27.4 (81.3)	30.5 (86.9)	29.8 (85.6)	26.6 (79.9)	22.3 (72.1)	18.0 (64.4)	13.5 (56.3)	21.2 (70.2)
Daily mean °C (°F)	6.3 (43.3)	7.6 (45.7)	10.8 (51.4)	15.7 (60.3)	19.6 (67.3)	23.0 (73.4)	25.5 (77.9)	24.8 (76.6)	21.9 (71.4)	17.5 (63.5)	13.2 (55.8)	8.2 (46.8)	16.2 (61.1)
Mean daily minimum °C (°F)	2.9 (37.2)	4.1 (39.4)	6.9 (44.4)	11.5 (52.7)	15.8 (60.4)	19.8 (67.6)	21.8 (71.2)	21.3 (70.3)	18.6 (65.5)	13.9 (57.0)	9.6 (49.3)	4.6 (40.3)	12.6 (54.6)
Record low °C (°F)	−7.1 (19.2)	−5.8 (21.6)	−4.8 (23.4)	0.7 (33.3)	5.8 (42.4)	10.0 (50.0)	16.3 (61.3)	16.3 (61.3)	9.1 (48.4)	1.8 (35.2)	−2.6 (27.3)	−9.8 (14.4)	−9.8 (14.4)
Average precipitation mm (inches)	67.7 (2.67)	94.4 (3.72)	161.2 (6.35)	153.3 (6.04)	197.8 (7.79)	322.8 (12.71)	267.7 (10.54)	367.3 (14.46)	224.7 (8.85)	85.0 (3.35)	71.3 (2.81)	62.7 (2.47)	2,075.9 (81.76)
Average precipitation days (≥ 0.1 mm)	14.6	15.1	18.7	17.2	18.2	19.2	15.0	19.1	15.3	10.1	11.6	12.2	186.3
Average snowy days	2.0	2.0	0.6	0.1	0	0	0	0	0	0	0	0.5	5.2
Average relative humidity (%)	81	82	81	78	80	83	79	81	81	77	80	78	80
Mean monthly sunshine hours	105.0	95.9	108.2	128.3	126.4	125.0	207.0	179.0	142.4	151.0	113.2	120.7	1,602.1
Percentage possible sunshine	32	30	29	33	30	30	49	44	39	43	35	37	36
Source: China Meteorological AdministrationAll-time April high
