= Ningde =

Ningde 宁德市
- Prefecture-level city
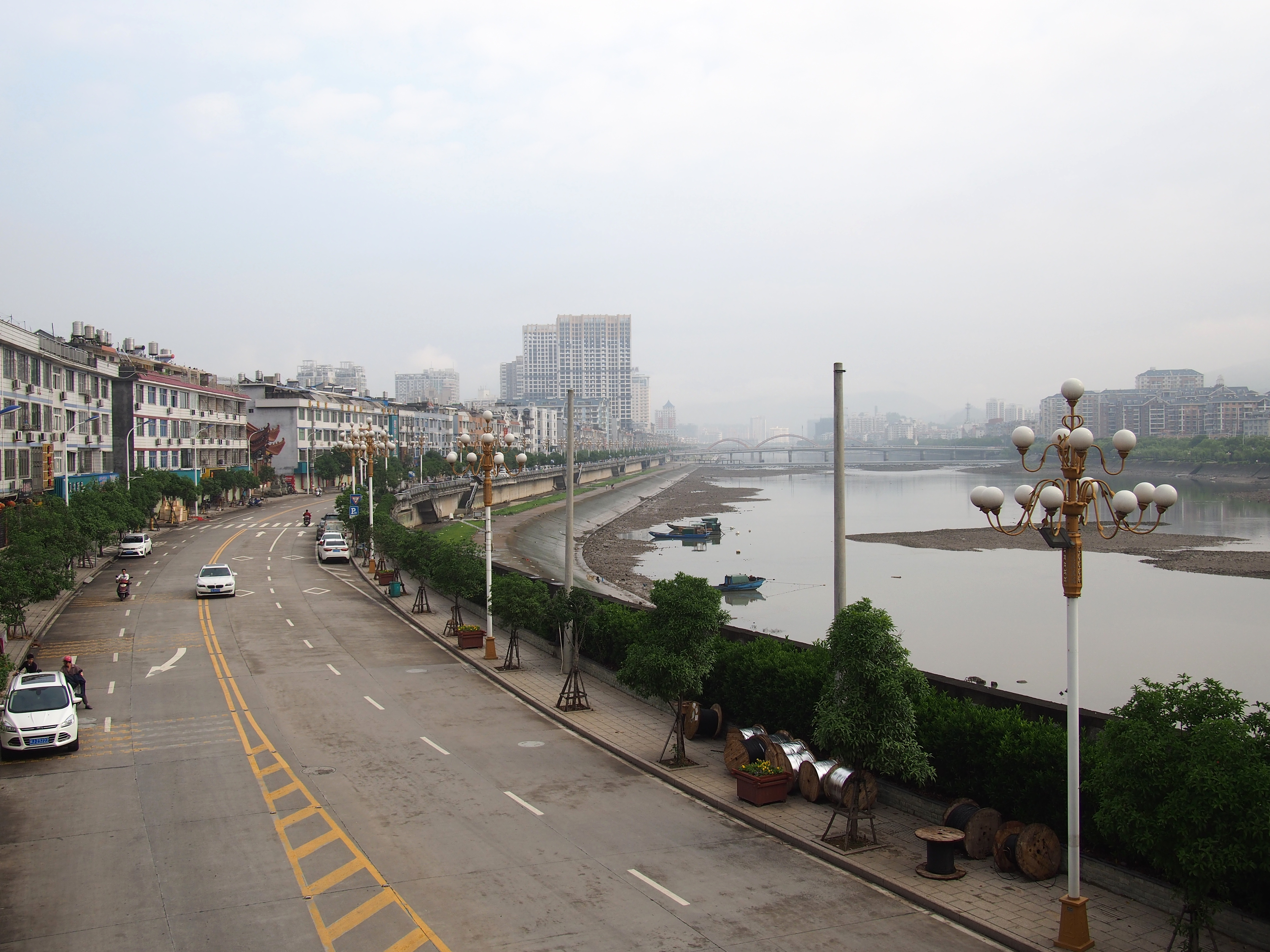
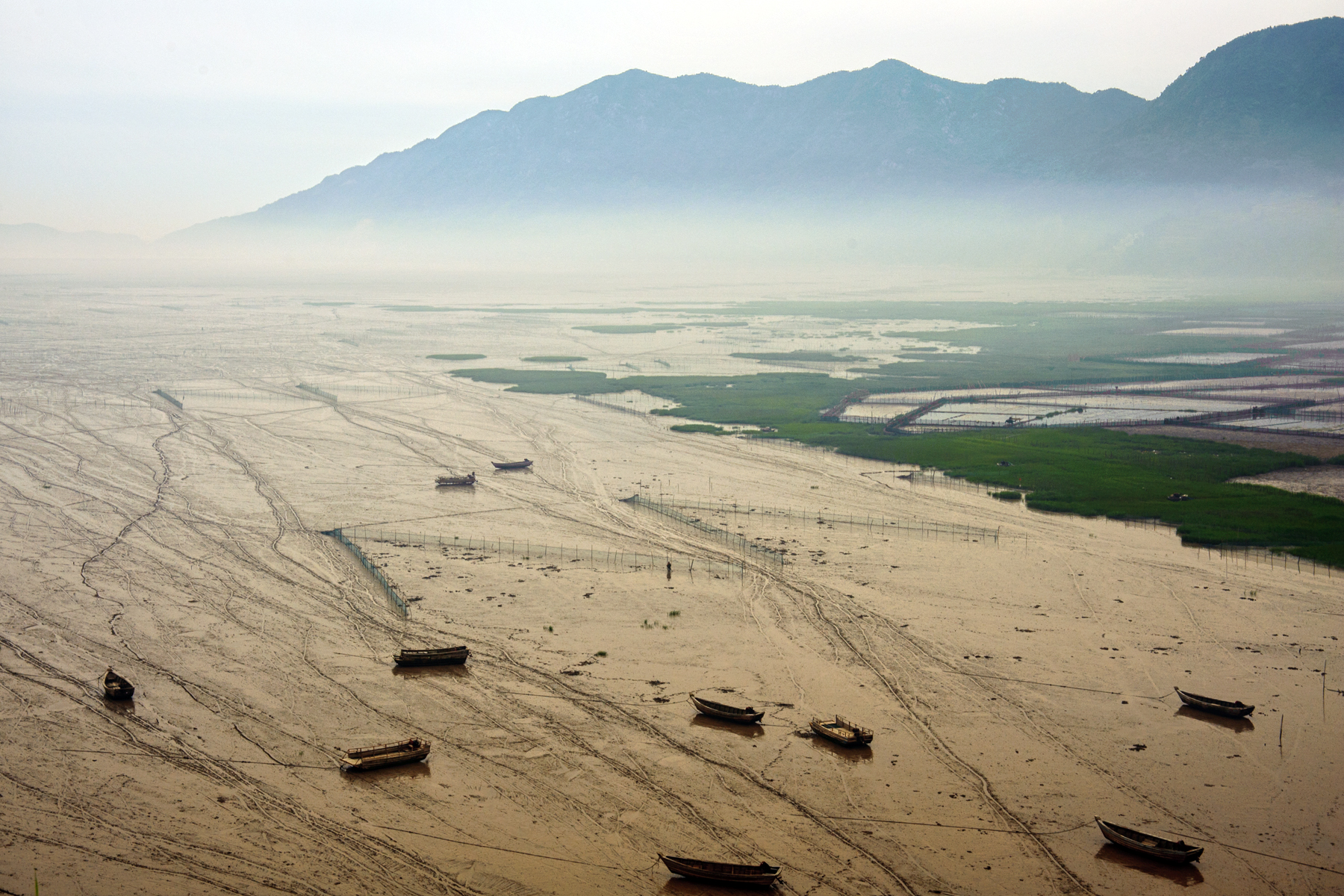
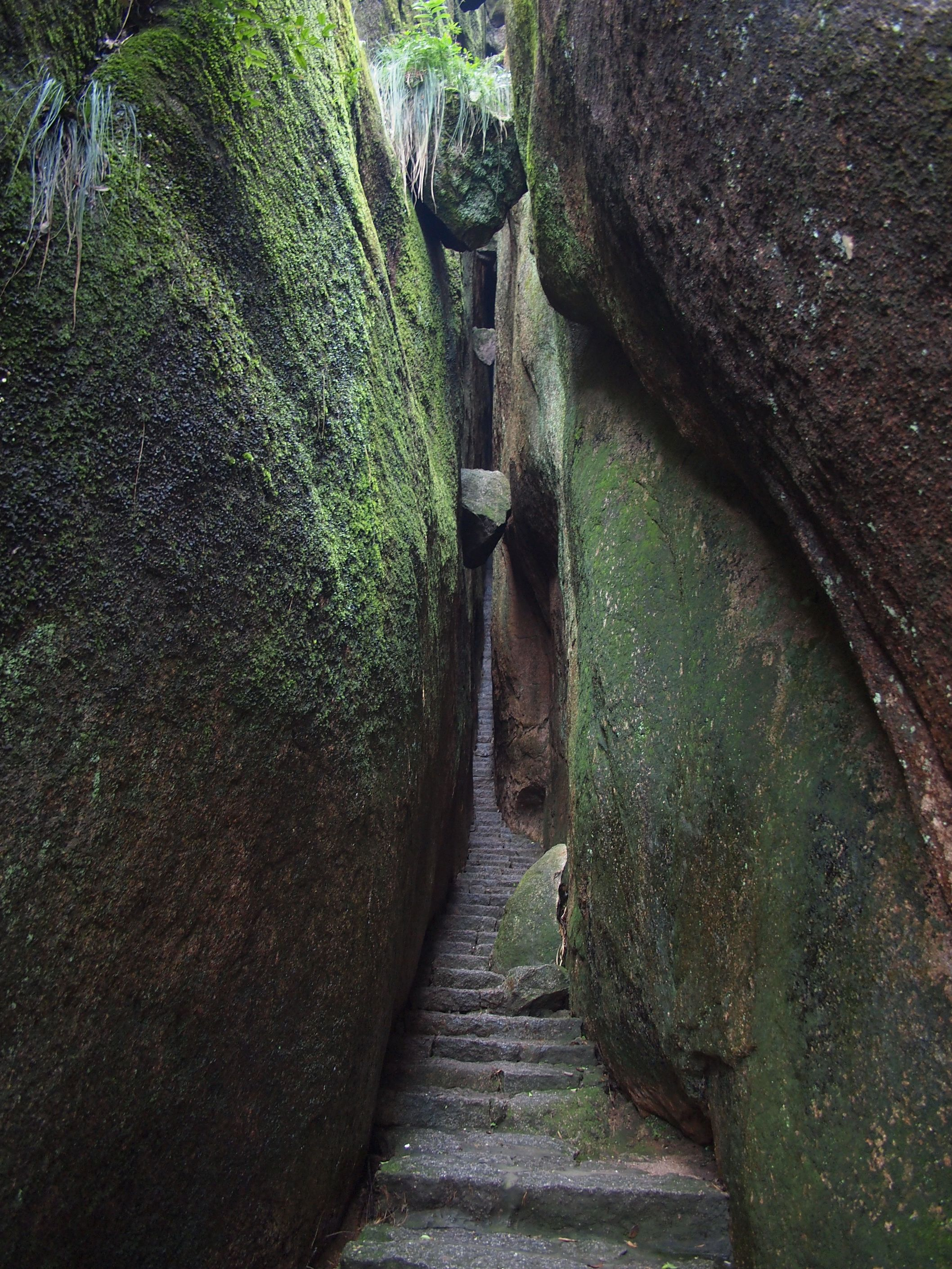
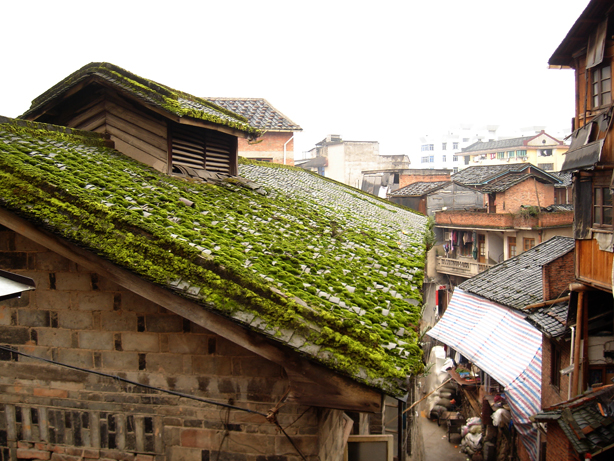
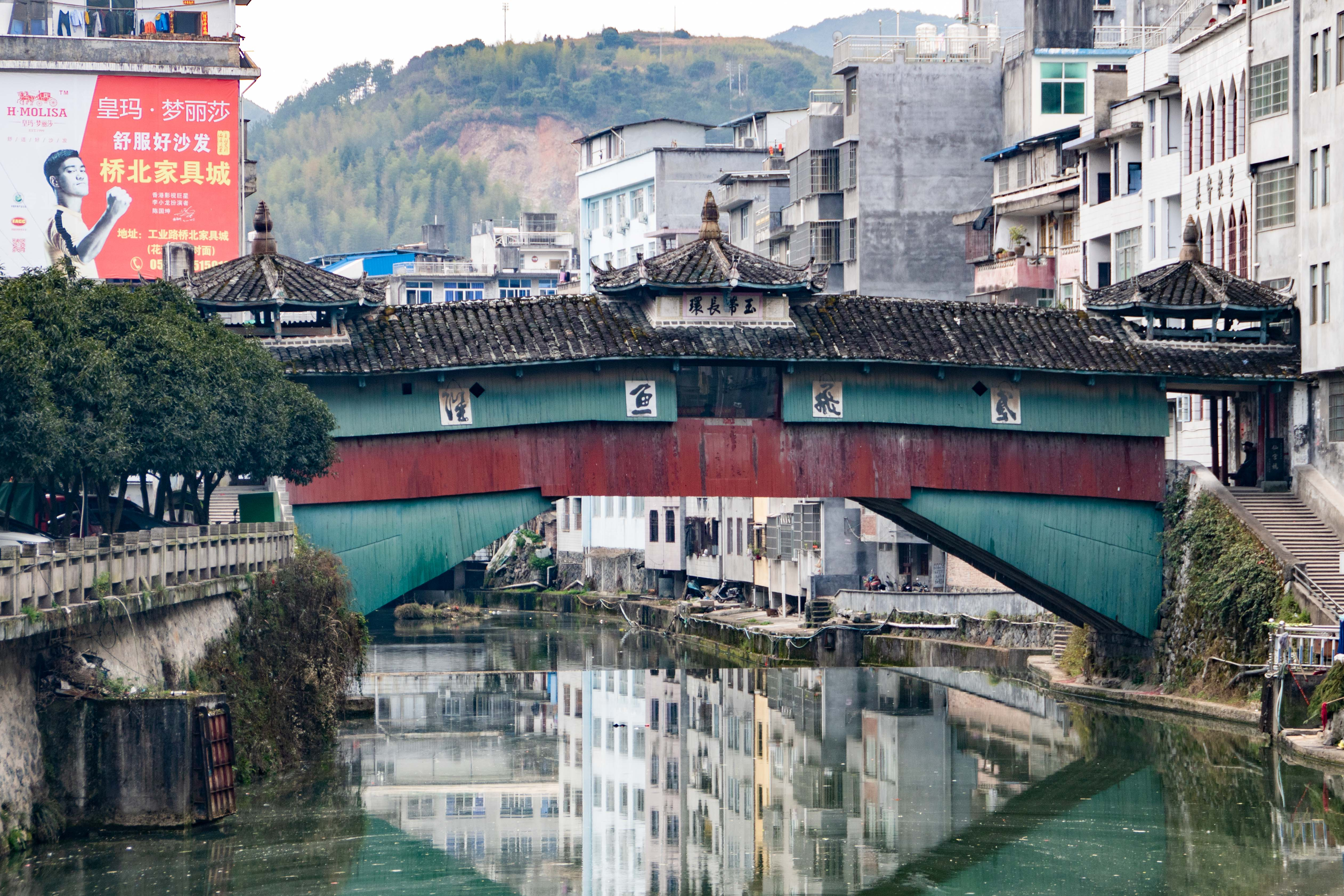
- Clockwise from top: Jiangbin Road along the Min River, Reach Heaven Cave at Mount Taimu, Xian'gong Bridge in Shouning County, houses in the old quarter of Ningde, aquaculture in Xiapu County.

- Location of Ningde City in Fujian

- Location within Fujian Location within China
- Coordinates (Ningde municipal government): 26°39′58″N 119°32′52″E
- Country: China
- Province: Fujian
- Municipal seat: Jiaocheng

Government
  - CPC Secretary: Pan Guoqiang (潘国强)
  - Mayor: Fu Zangrong (傅藏荣)

Area
  - Prefecture-level city: 13,452 km^{2} (5,194 sq mi)

Population (2010 Census)
  - Prefecture-level city: 2,821,996
  - Density: 209.78/km^{2} (543.33/sq mi)
  - Urban: 343,262
  - Metro: 623,840

GDP
  - Prefecture-level city: CN¥ 245.2 billion US$ 37.4 billion
  - Per capita: CN¥ 84,251; US$ 12,849
- Time zone: UTC+8 (CST)
- Postal code: 352000, 355000
- Area code: 593
- ISO 3166 code: CN-FJ-09
- License Plate: 闽J
- Local variety: Eastern Min
- City flowers: Canna indica
- Website: ningde.gov.cn

Ningde, (Note: Chinese: 宁德; pinyin: Níngdé; Foochow Romanized: Nìng-dáik; also known as Mindong; Chinese: 闽东; pinyin: Mǐndōng; Foochow Romanized: Mìng-dĕ̤ng; lit. East of Fujian) previously romanized as Ningteh and Ning-Taik, is a city located along the northeastern coast of Fujian, China. It borders the provincial capital of Fuzhou City to the south, Wenzhou Prefecture of Zhejiang to the north, and Nanping to the west.

The prefecture-level Ningde City administers 1 district, 2 cities, 6 counties, as well as 124 towns, townships and subdistricts. Listed below are the district, cities and counties, first four of which are coastal whereas the rest are located in mountainous areas.

Situated roughly 300 kilometres (190 mi) north of the Tropic of Cancer, the prefecture of Ningde spans 13,500 square kilometres (5,200 sq mi) in land area. Like the rest of the province, Ningde sits in a mountainous region but it also enjoys almost 200 kilometres (120 mi) of coastline facing the East China Sea. Ningde is listed No.2 in China Integrated City Index 2016's environmental ranking, a study conducted by the National Development and Reform Commission.

== Economy ==
=== Agriculture ===
The warm and moist climate and fertile land in the prefecture of Ningde provide it with favorable conditions for agriculture. The largest agricultural exports from Ningde include mushroom and tea. The area also produces large quantities of various fruits, such as shaddocks, Chinese chestnuts, plums, honey peaches, lychees and longans.

Tea cultivation has long been an important industry of Ningde. By 1999 statistics, the total area of tea plantations in Ningde had reached 463 square kilometres (179 sq mi) and the output of green tea took up 10.5 percent of that of the entire country. More than 1.2 million jobs were created directly and indirectly in different stages of the tea industry. Famous brands include the Tianshan Silver-Needle Tea, Baihao Silver-Needle Tea, Fenghuangshe, Lianyue Flower Tea and Xianyan Snow Peak.

The mountainous landscape and advantageous climate conditions are also beneficial to the development of forestry. Up to 1999, 8,482 square kilometres (3,275 sq mi), or 65.2 percent of the entire prefecture, are forested. Out of this area, bamboo groves occupy 600 square kilometres (230 sq mi), producing an annual output of six million bamboo products. In Fu'an alone, the green bamboo base has extended to 34 square kilometres (13 sq mi) and its output of green bamboo shoots takes up more than 60 percent of the entire provincial output.

==== Aquaculture ====
The prefecture of Ningde is blessed with vast area of shallow sea, which is suitable for aquaculture. In 2000, aquatic products take up 41.3 percent of the total output value of agriculture from Ningde, with an exporting value of US$82,170,000 and an annual net income exceeding RMB 3,500 for local fishermen. Major products include yellow croakers, oysters, razor clams, prawns and freshwater eels.

Local government is attempting to use aquaculture as a springboard to eliminate poverty and improve the local economy. Up to 2000, aquaculture had created 370,000 jobs directly and indirectly; a total of RMB 4.5 billion had been invested, drawing an annual output value of RMB 2 billion.

=== Industry ===
Ningde is a producer of many nonmetallic mineral resources, such as granite, diorite and basalt. The confirmed volume of granite reserves extends to 1,140 million cubic meters, while estimated amount of deposits undiscovered stands at several thousand million cubic meters. The mining area for basalt in Bailin, Fuding, known as Fuding Black, covers 0.21 square kilometres (0.081 sq mi) with a total deposit of up to 50 million cubic meters.

Ningde's rich hydropower resources give it a headstart in metallurgical industries. Products such as magnesium, zirconium oxide, aluminum, high-purity silicon carbide, and a series of other silicon products from plants in the prefecture enjoy high reputation and are exempted from examination when exported to Japan. Advances in metallurgical technology also aids the shipbuilding industry, a traditional trade in Ningde. In recent years, local shipyards have been capable of constructing 10,000-ton steamships.

Ningde owns electricity industry providing energy supply for the need of local as well as for other metropolitan areas such as Fuzhou and Wenzhou. China Datang Corporation runs 2520 MW fired power plant in Fu'an City. The first nuclear power plant Ningde Nuclear Power Plant start to operate from 2008. CFR-600 is under construction in Xiapu county.

Battery industry is another fast growing sector in Ningde region. CATL (寧德時代), the world's biggest lithium-ion batteries manufacturer has its headquarters and production lines located in the Jiaocheng district of Ningde.

== Administrative subdivisions and Demographics ==
According to the 2010 Census, Ningde has a registered population of 3,393,698 inhabitants, although 2,821,996 persons declared to be permanent residents. It is also the primary residential region for the She minority people, who take up to 25% of the total population. A majority of the population speak Eastern Min.

Map
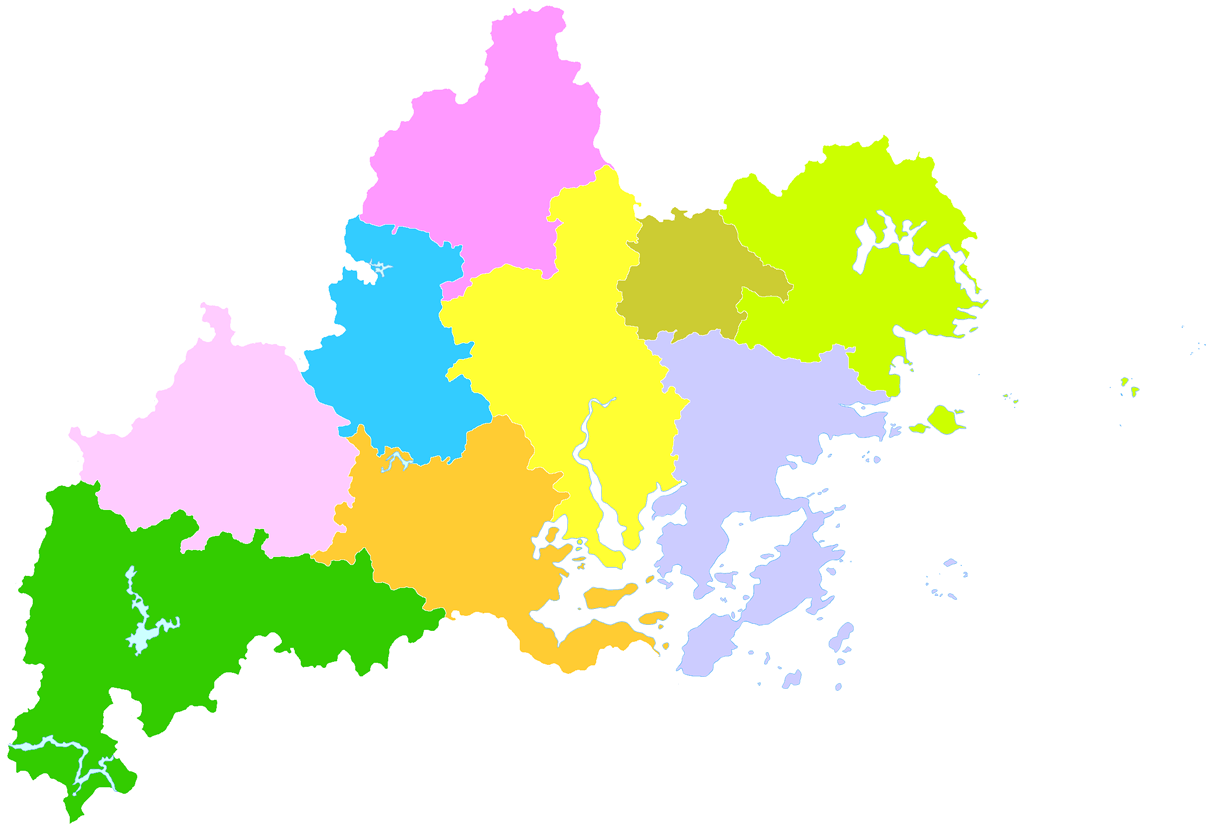

English name	Simplified	Pinyin	Foochow	Area	Population	Density
Jiaocheng District	蕉城区	Jiāochéng Qū	Ciĕu-siàng-kṳ̆	1,537	623,840	279
Fu'an City	福安市	Fú'ān Shì	Hók-ăng-chê	1,795	563,640	314
Fuding City	福鼎市	Fúdǐng Shì	Hók-tīng-chê	1,526	529,534	347
Xiapu County	霞浦县	Xiápǔ Xiàn	Hà-puō-gâing	1,716	461,176	269
Gutian County	古田县	Gǔtián Xiàn	Kŭ-chèng-gâing	2,377	323,700	136
Pingnan County	屏南县	Píngnán Xiàn	Bìng-nàng-gâing	1,485	137,724	93
Shouning County	寿宁县	Shòuníng Xiàn	Sêu-nìng-gâing	1,425	175,874	123
Zherong County	柘荣县	Zhèróng Xiàn	Ciá-ìng-gâing	544	88,387	162
Zhouning County	周宁县	Zhōuníng Xiàn	Ciŭ-nìng-gâing	1,047	112,701	108

== Climate ==
It is subjected to a humid subtropical climate, with occasional threat of typhoons. Within the prefecture, the mean annual temperature ranges from 13.4 to 20.2 °C (56.1 to 68.4 °F), while mean annual rainfall ranges from 1,250 to 2,350 millimetres (49 to 93 in).

Climate data for Ningde, elevation 32 m (105 ft), (1991–2020 normals, extremes 1963–present)
Month	Jan	Feb	Mar	Apr	May	Jun	Jul	Aug	Sep	Oct	Nov	Dec	Year
Record high °C (°F)	26.9 (80.4)	28.7 (83.7)	30.9 (87.6)	34.9 (94.8)	38.6 (101.5)	38.2 (100.8)	42.0 (107.6)	40.0 (104.0)	37.9 (100.2)	34.7 (94.5)	32.4 (90.3)	27.5 (81.5)	42.0 (107.6)
Mean daily maximum °C (°F)	14.0 (57.2)	14.8 (58.6)	17.5 (63.5)	22.3 (72.1)	26.4 (79.5)	30.1 (86.2)	33.5 (92.3)	32.8 (91.0)	30.1 (86.2)	26.0 (78.8)	21.4 (70.5)	16.5 (61.7)	23.8 (74.8)
Daily mean °C (°F)	10.6 (51.1)	11.2 (52.2)	13.6 (56.5)	18.2 (64.8)	22.6 (72.7)	26.4 (79.5)	29.4 (84.9)	28.9 (84.0)	26.5 (79.7)	22.3 (72.1)	17.9 (64.2)	12.8 (55.0)	20.0 (68.1)
Mean daily minimum °C (°F)	8.3 (46.9)	8.8 (47.8)	11.0 (51.8)	15.2 (59.4)	19.7 (67.5)	23.6 (74.5)	26.3 (79.3)	25.9 (78.6)	23.6 (74.5)	19.3 (66.7)	15.2 (59.4)	10.2 (50.4)	17.3 (63.1)
Record low °C (°F)	−2.4 (27.7)	−0.6 (30.9)	0.8 (33.4)	7.3 (45.1)	10.6 (51.1)	15.7 (60.3)	20.4 (68.7)	21.5 (70.7)	15.6 (60.1)	10.7 (51.3)	5.5 (41.9)	−1.4 (29.5)	−2.4 (27.7)
Average precipitation mm (inches)	81.9 (3.22)	101.6 (4.00)	166.4 (6.55)	147.2 (5.80)	217.2 (8.55)	297.6 (11.72)	207.5 (8.17)	323.0 (12.72)	213.0 (8.39)	85.5 (3.37)	89.4 (3.52)	74.4 (2.93)	2,004.7 (78.94)
Average precipitation days (≥ 0.1 mm)	13.5	15.1	18.5	16.3	18.0	17.6	13.1	16.2	14.6	9.0	11.3	11.5	174.7
Average snowy days	0.1	0.3	0	0	0	0	0	0	0	0	0	0.1	0.5
Average relative humidity (%)	77	79	79	78	79	81	76	76	75	71	74	74	77
Mean monthly sunshine hours	92.2	83.5	95.4	114.8	121.6	128.6	209.1	180.6	151.4	152.8	107.4	105.9	1,543.3
Percentage possible sunshine	28	26	25	30	29	31	50	45	41	43	33	33	35
Source: China Meteorological Administration all-time extreme temperatures All-time April high

== History ==
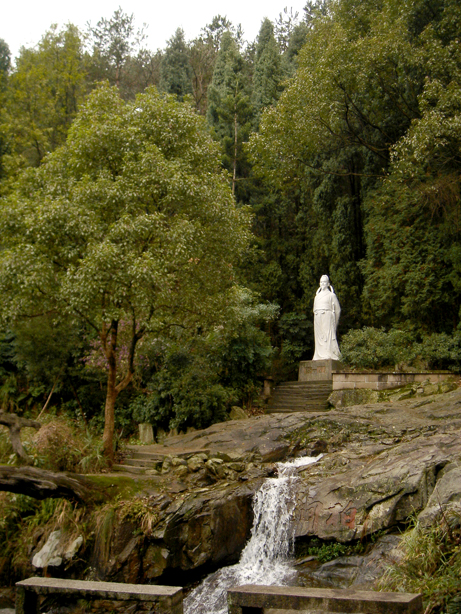
Statue of Lu You on Nanji Hill in Jiaocheng District

Ningde's history dates back to the Stamped Pottery Culture System (海印紋陶文化系統 Hāi-éng-ùng-dò̤ Ùng-huá Hiê-tūng). As early as 10,000 to 20,000 years ago during the late Upper Palaeolithic period of the Stone Age (also known as the Old Stone Age) there were already human beings living and multiplying here. In 282, the Jin Dynasty government established magistrate rule here.

In 1934, an Administration Supervision Zone was set up here under the Republic of China. After the establishment of the People's Republic of China in 1949, the Fu'an Special Administration Zone was established. Finally in June 1971 the Zone was promoted to Ningde Prefecture. Xi Jinping served as the Chinese Communist Party Committee Secretary of Ningde between 1988 and 1990.

== Culture ==
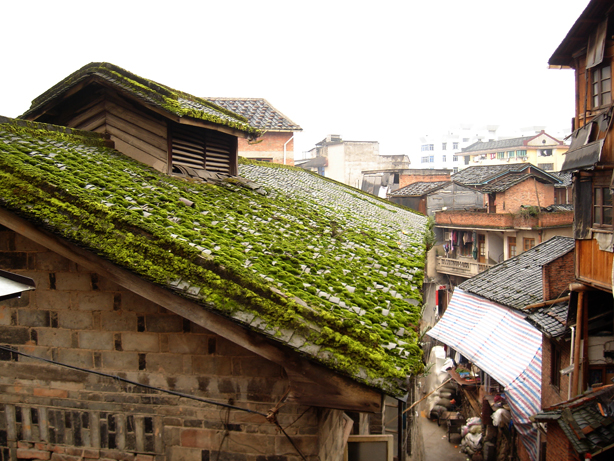
An old district in urban Ningde City. Like many other Chinese cities, Ningde is developing fast economically and old houses like these are giving way to new, modern buildings.

The folk arts in Ningde are varied and colorful. Among them bantieji parade (搬铁技), puppet lion dance, and paper art are the most representative.

The bantieji parade, mostly seen during the Chinese new year, is a folk art performance popularized in Ningde since the Qing Dynasty. During the parade, children dressed as characters from various Chinese folklore sit or stand on parade vehicles, which were also decorated to resemble classic scenes such as the Heavenly Palace. The vehicles then cruise along the streets in the company of jovial music.

The puppet lion dance, popular in Huotong Town and Jiaocheng District, originated from toys of the local children. The lions, made of colorful fabrics, are connected to wooden racks by ropes. Each individual rope controls a part of the lion's body, such as the head, tail or foot. The racks are set on vehicles moving through the streets. Performers on the vehicles pull on the ropes to make the lions dance or perform various tricks.

Paper art, mainly practised by women, is a specialty of Zherong County. Common forms of the art include traditional flower patterns, words and daily life objects. Because of her paper art achievements, Zherong County was named "Home of Chinese Folk Arts" by the Ministry of Culture in 2000.

The She people have also created and left many precious cultural heritages in their long historical practice. Owing to projects in recent years to protect the She heritage, three volumes of She folk tales, songs and proverbs have been published. In total, 184 tales, 330,000 words in songs, and 6,000 proverbs have been included. Art works have also been produced out of She folklore, which reflects their way of life.

There are many covered bridges in Ningde, particularly in Pingnan. The 15,000-capacity Ningde Stadium is located in the city. It is mostly used for association football.

The Ningde UNESCO Global Geopark was created in 2015 in a volcanic region of the coast, comprising Baishuiyang, Taimushan and Baiyunshan scenic areas.

== See also ==
- CATL
- Mount Taimu
