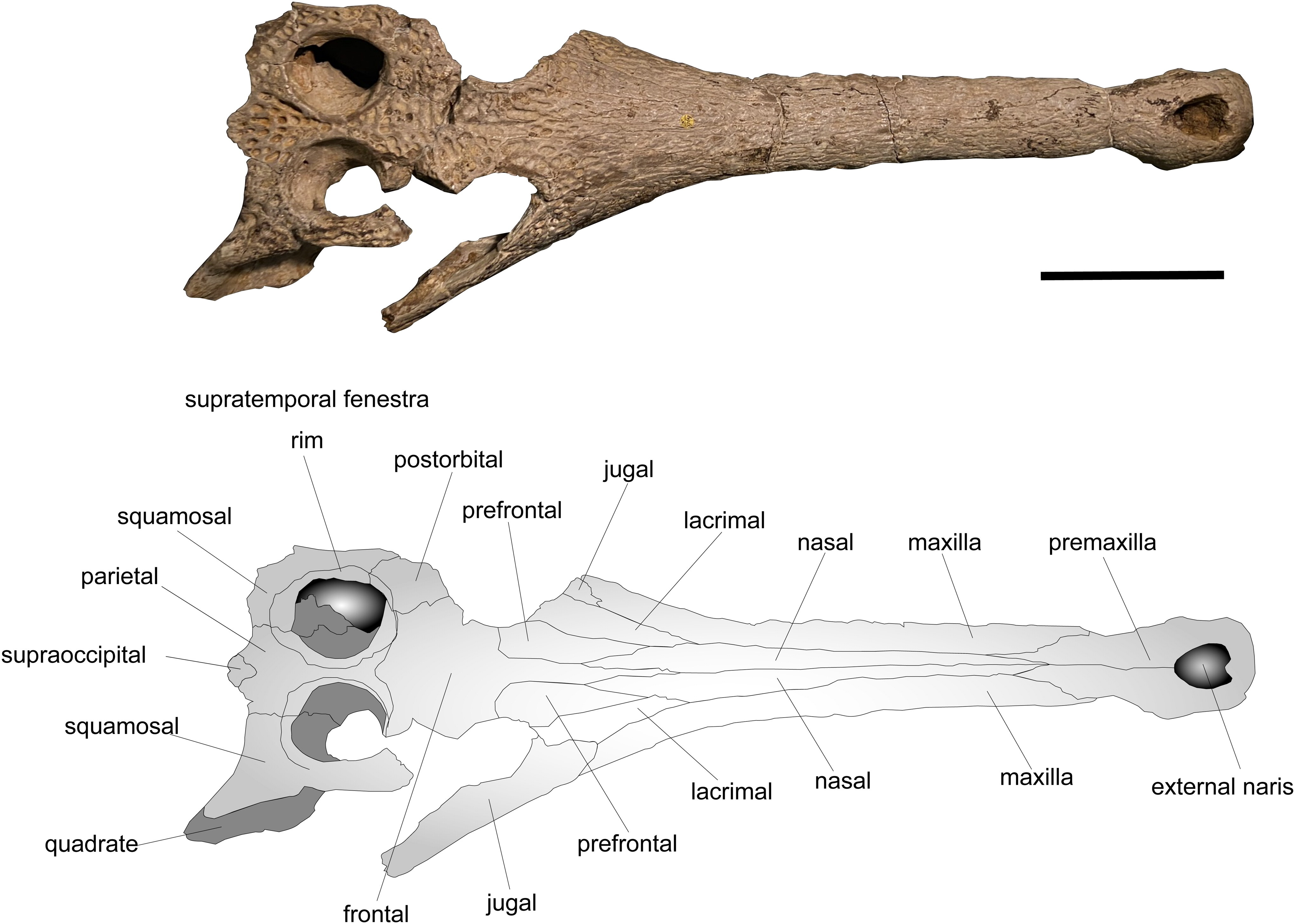
- Specimen NHMUK PV R 4769 in dorsal view

Scientific classification
- Kingdom: Animalia
- Phylum: Chordata
- Class: Reptilia
- Clade: Archosauria
- Order: Crocodilia
- Superfamily: Gavialoidea
- Family: Gavialidae
- Subfamily: Gavialinae
- Genus: †Sutekhsuchus; Burke et al., 2024

Type species
- †Sutekhsuchus dowsoni Fourtau, 1920

Synonyms
- Tomistoma dowsoni Fourtau, 1920

= Sutekhsuchus =

Sutekhsuchus Temporal range: Early Miocene Burdigalian

Genus of gharial

Sutekhsuchus (formerly known as Tomistoma dowsoni) is a species of gavialine crocodilian from the Miocene of Libya and Egypt. While this species was originally described as a species of the genus Tomistoma, which includes the modern false gharial, later studies have shown that it was actually a much more derived gavialoid closely related to the Kenyan Eogavialis andrewsi. Since it initially "deceived" paleontologists, it was named for the Egyptian god of deception Sutekh (also known as Set). It once inhabited the slow-moving rivers, estuaries and lagoons of what is now Gebel Zelten and Wadi Moghra, environments it shared with a variety of other crocodilians including the narrow-snouted Euthecodon and the robust Rimasuchus. Depressions on the inner side of the skull might also correlate with the presence of salt glands, which would have allowed it to more easily ventured out into marine environments. Only a single species is currently assigned to Sutekhsuchus, the type species S. dowsoni.

== History and naming ==
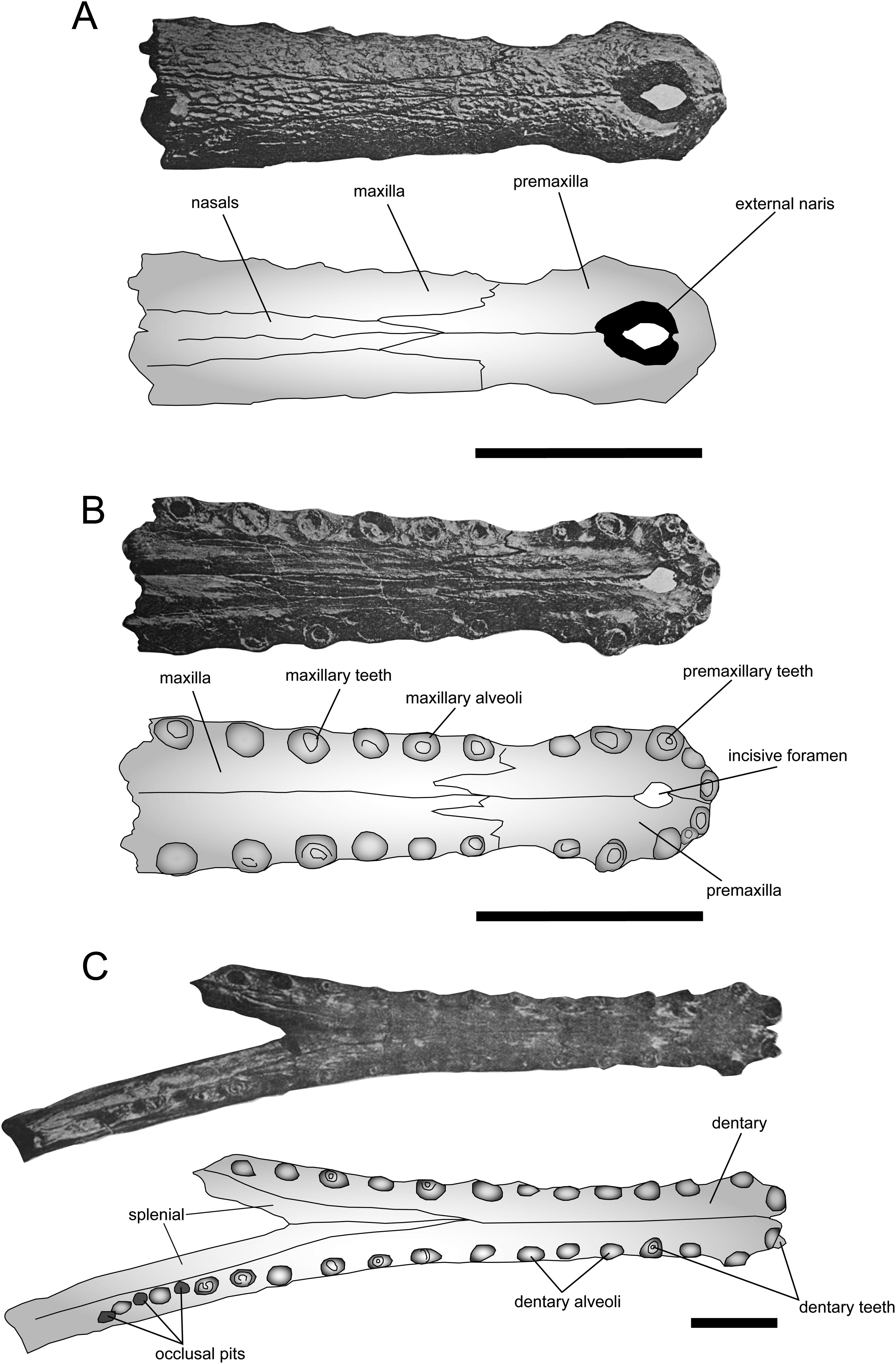
The now lost syntype material of Sutekhsuchus.

The species Tomistoma dowsoni was coined in 1920 by René Fourtau based on assorted fragments including a lower jaw and the tip of the snout recovered from the Moghra Formation at Wadi Moghra in Egypt. The author did not provide an actual holotype or specimen numbers, and his material is now thought to be lost. By 1973 a second specimen (NHMUK PV R 4769) had been discovered at the nearby Siwa Oasis and was referred to T. dowsoni by William Roger Hamilton. While multiple studies went on to use this much more complete specimen as a stand in for the holotype of T. dowsoni in phylogenetic analyses its specific referral was never questioned throughout most its history, even with it being generally accepted that this species did not directly clade with the modern false gharial of the genus Tomistoma.

In the year 2000, Christopher Brochu and Philip D. Gingerich published a paper that argued that all tomistomines of the Miocene Mediterranean represented a single taxon, Tomistoma lusitanica. Llinás Agrasar followed this conclusion when describing fossils (MNHN LBE 300–302) from the Maradah Formation at Gebel Zelten, Libya, in 2004, but did note that the animal closely resembled the specimens previously known as Tomistoma dowsoni. In 2015 Stephane Jouve and colleagues once again suggested that T. dowsoni was a valid and distinct species, citing differences between Hamilton's specimen and T. lusitanica.

In 2024 Burke and colleagues published a study describing the skull of T. dowsoni in detail as well as evaluating the material referred to the species. In accordance with phylogenetic analyses consistently recovering T. dowsoni as only distantly related to the modern false gharial, a new generic name was coined for and assigned to the material: Sutekhsuchus.

The name Sutekhsuchus derives from the Egyptian deities Sutekh, better known as Set, and Sobek. Sobek is the root of the Latin "suchus", which means crocodile and has been used as a suffix in the scientific names of many crocodilians. The reference to Sutekh/Set meanwhile is rooted in the fact that Sutekh is known as the "god of deception", which is paralleled with the fact that Sutekhsuchus was initially taken to be a species of Tomistoma.

== Description ==
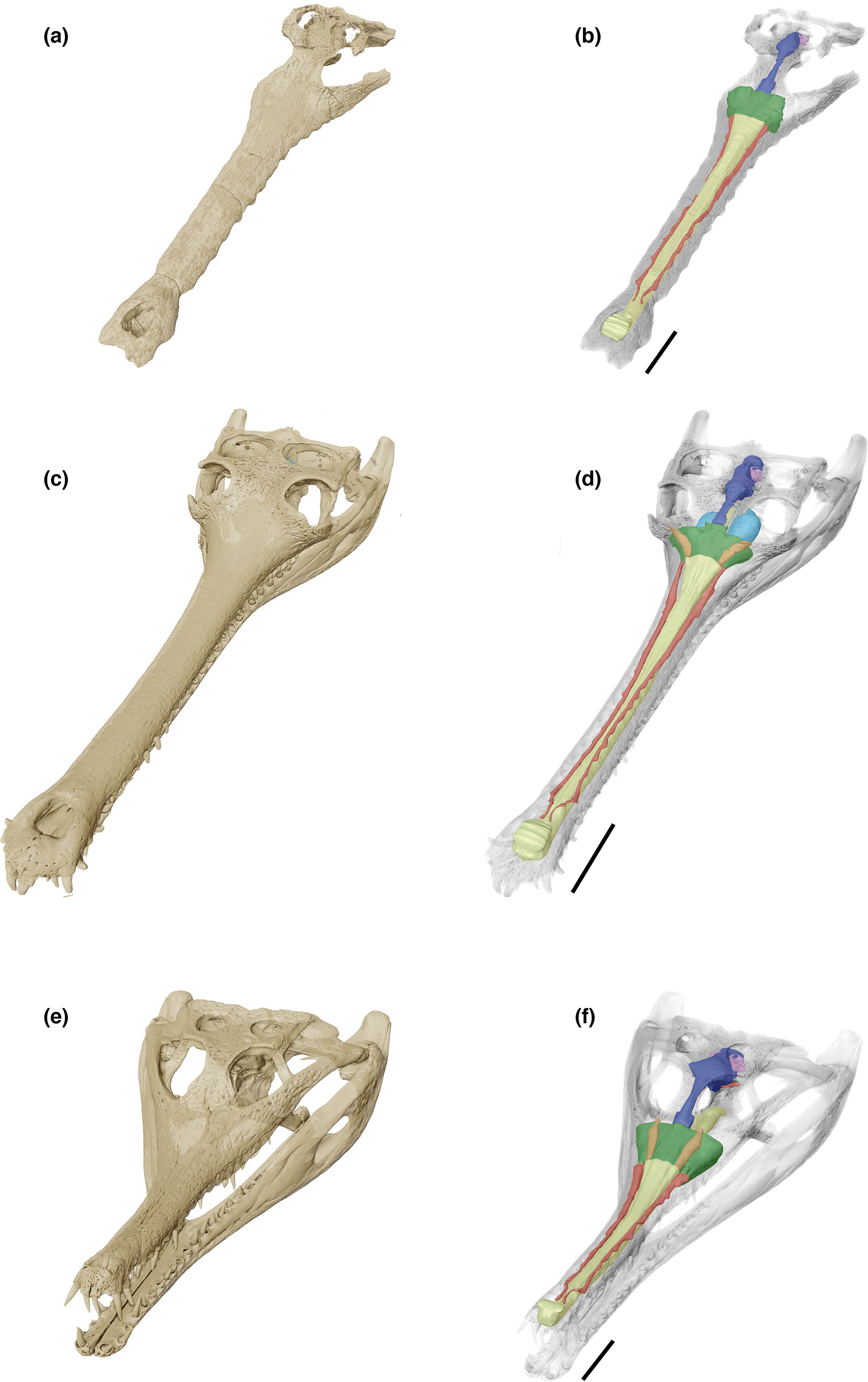
The skull and endocast of Sutekhsuchus (a,b) compared to the Indian gharial (c,d) and false gharial (e,f).

Like all gavialoids, Sutekhsuchus possessed a prominently elongated snout that in its case makes up approximately 83% of the entire skull length. The widest point of the rostrum occurs around the level of the second premaxillary tooth in the Hamilton skull and the fourth in the syntype before the snout rapidly constricts just behind the premaxillae. After this point the snout returns to a width just shy of the maximum reached by the premaxillae, remaining consistent before widening towards the back of the skull. The external nares are elongated and heart-shaped, which closely resembles the closely related species of the genus Eogavialis. Paul Burke and colleagues note that heart-shaped nares are also known from some gryposuchines, though in these forms the opening is much wider and not as elongated. The nares are entirely surrounded by the premaxillae, which extend back to meet the nasal bones and maxillae. Notably, the premaxillae extend as far back as the third maxillary tooth, a trait shared with Tomistoma gaudense but otherwise not seen in gharials. When looking at the skull from below, the premaxillae do not extend as far back as they do in dorsal view. Like in false gharials, the premaxillae go as far back as the second maxillary tooth, while in Eogavialis they extend to somewhere around the second to third maxillary tooth and the fourth in Gavialis.

Unlike in many contemporary forms such as Gavialosuchus and Tomistoma lusitanica, the maxillae do not extend between the nasals and the lacrimals, instead resembling what is seen in the modern false gharial. Unique among gharials is the fact that both the lacrimal and the prefrontal are equal in length. Typically, the lacrimal bones are longer than the adjacent prefrontals, with the only other exception being Penghusuchus, which has noticeably shorter lacrimals. The orbits are large and elliptical, though they are only incompletely known. The inner margin of the eyes has been noted to be upturned, a condition that is shared by today's false gharial as well as all other Miocene gharials of Europe and North America. This is effectively the opposite of what is seen in the Indian gharial, in which the margins of the eyesocket projects into the opening.

The frontal bone serves as a bridge between the rostrum and the skull table and, like in derived gavialoids, extends beyond the front-most tip of the prefrontals, forming a long anterior process. This also causes the frontal to extend before the jugals, which form the lower margin of the orbits. The skull table is formed by the frontal, the postorbitals, the squamosals, the parietal and the supraoccipital and bears two large openings, the supratemporal fenestrae. Like in false gharials and the other Miocene taxa that lived around the Mediterranean, the way the frontal contacts the parietal effectively means that the frontal plays no part in forming the supratemporal fenestrae, while in modern Indian gharials they at least come into contact.

The supraoccipital forms the back of the skull table in both Sutekhsuchus and Eogavialis and forms a convex projection that is absent in most gavialoids other than Gavialis itself, in which the posterior-end of the supraoccipital is pointed. This does not mean that the supraoccipital does not participate in forming the skull table in other genera, as shown by Tomistoma gaudense and T. lusitanica, they simply lack the prominent protrusion at the back of the skull seen in Sutekhsuchus. Conversely, several early diverging gavialoids, the modern false gharial included, feature an indentation in the skull table where these more derived forms preserve the supraoccipital. The squamosals, which form the back corners of the skull table, are bevelled, which exposes their lower margin that forms the sides of the element. The fact that the edges are bevelled also serves to set Sutekhsuchus apart from contemporary European forms which had much more planar skull tables.

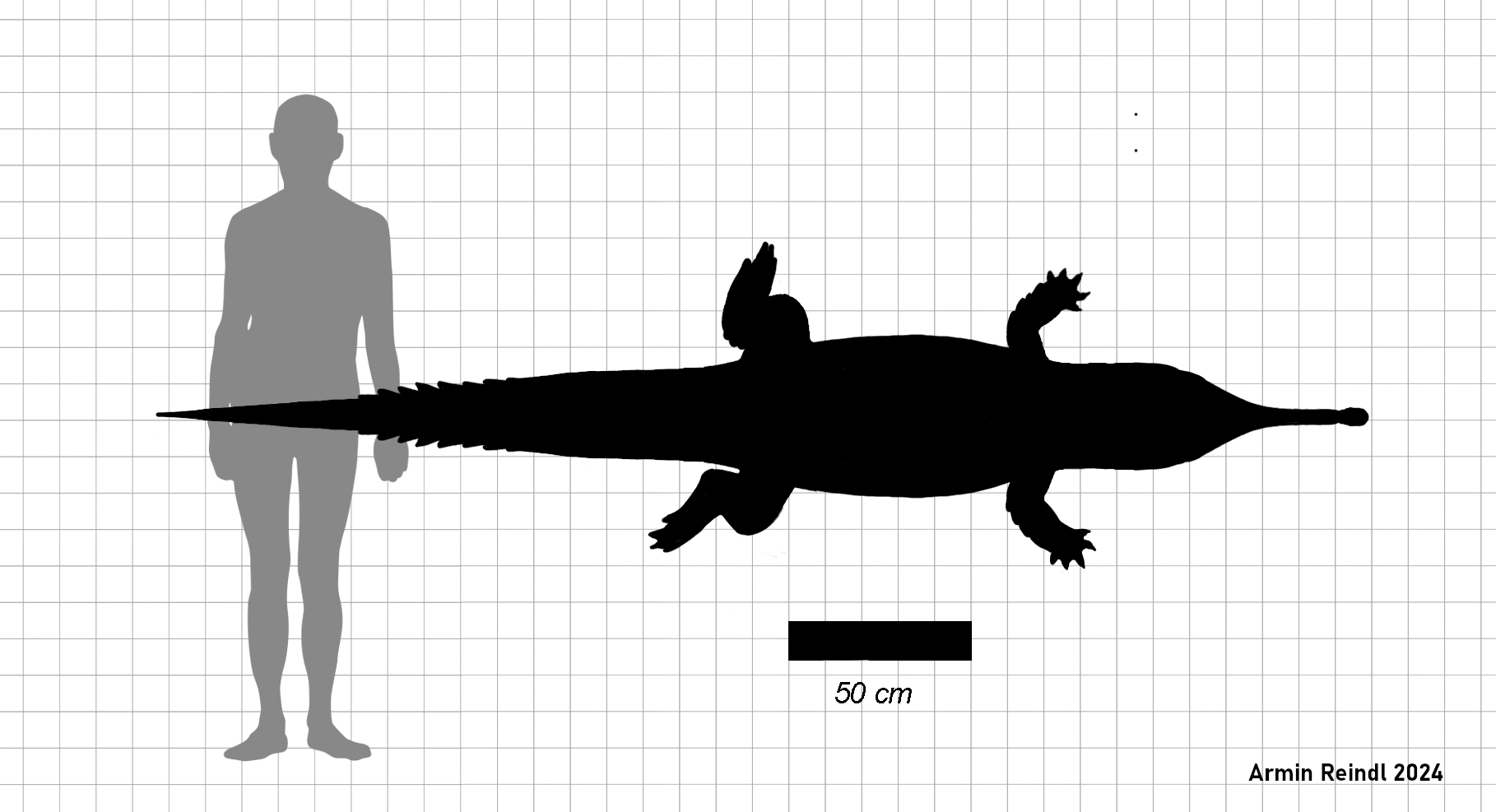
Size comparison of Sutekhsuchus.

The lower surface of the skull also features a variety of features that distinguish Sutekhsuchus from other gavialoids. For example, the contact between the premaxillae and maxillae features two pointed tips that give the suture a W-shape. While this is similar to the anatomy of the false gharial, most gavialoids including Eogavialis and Gavialis only feature one tip. Another aspect shared between Sutekhsuchus and Tomistoma is the contact between the maxilla-palatine suture and the suborbital fenestrae, which intersects the skull openings towards the front of their inner margin, while in later gavialines this contact is moved further to the front. As a whole, the fenestrae start well before the eyesockets on the opposite side of the skull. This is the typical condition for gavialoids, although it was lost in some more derived taxa like Gavialis gangeticus.

=== Dentition ===
Sutekhsuchus possessed five teeth in its premaxillae, with the third and fourth sitting in line with one another. These teeth are followed by around 15 teeth in each of the maxillae. The alveoli range from subcircular to elliptical in shape and are described as homodont, having very consistent size and spacing. This is contrasted by the other African and European gavialoids of the Miocene, which often feature teeth that varied in size when compared to those around them. For example, the fourth and fifth maxillary teeth of Tomistoma calaritanum and T. gaudense are enlarged, as is the fifth tooth in T. lusitanica and the sixth in Gavialosuchus eggenburgensis. The homodonty in terms of tooth spacing is not perfect however, as there is an unusually large space between the fourth and fifth maxillary teeth and an unusually small space between the 14th and 15th. Sutekhsuchus is among a select number of gavialoids in which the palatal surface of the upper jaw is located below the toothrow, meaning that the roof of the mouth is well visible even in profile view. Ultimately, the maxillary toothrow is followed by a short stretch of the maxilla that is toothless, something that sets them apart from many South American gavialines and Gavialis, which possess long toothless stretches at the end of the maxilla. The dentition of the premaxillae and maxillae oppose that of the dentaries, which count at least 16 preserved alveoli.

== Phylogeny ==
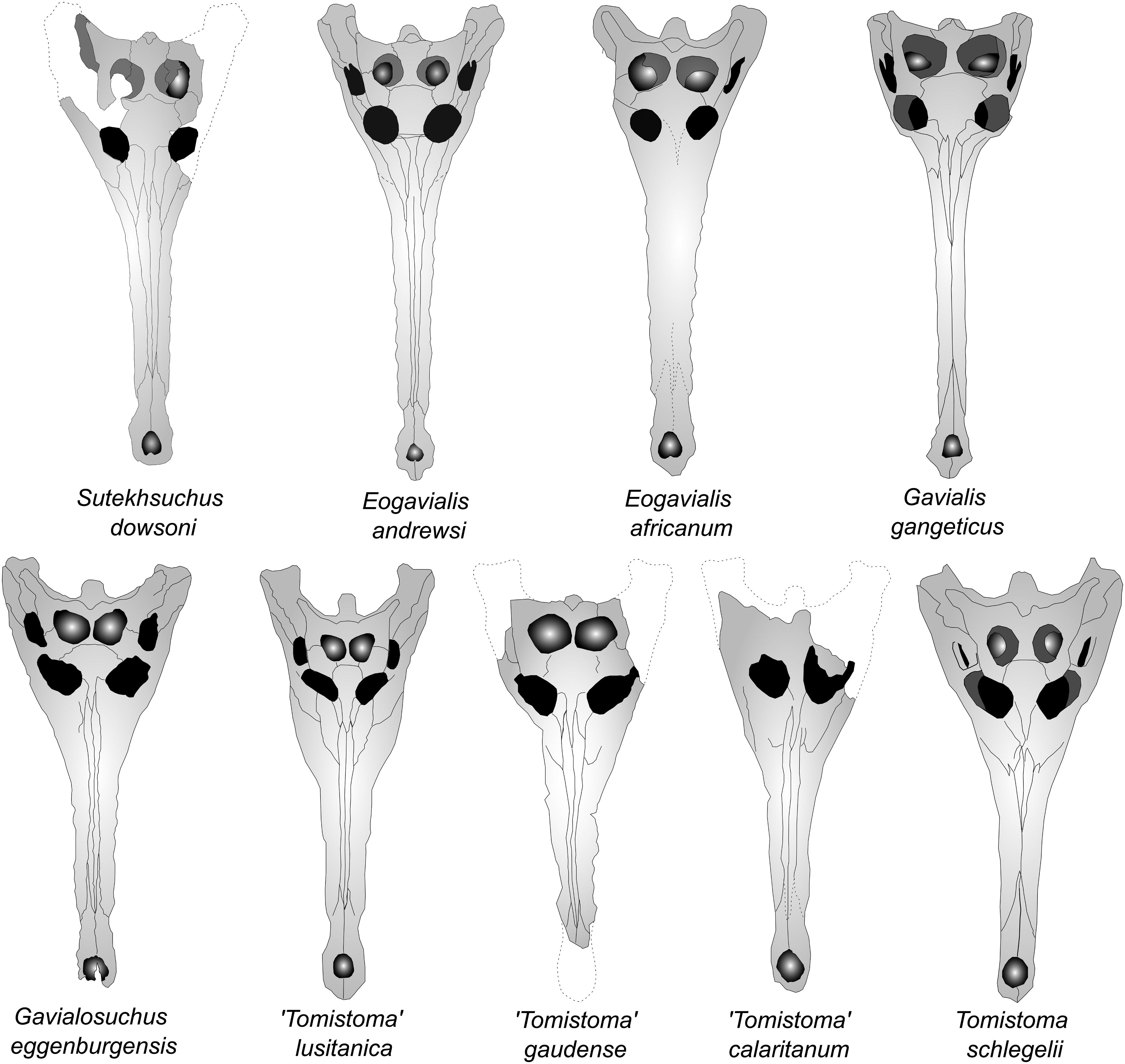
Skulls of various gavialoids in comparison

Although initially described as a species of Tomistoma, various studies have since called this assignment into question. Fossil material of Sutekhsuchus was not independently incorporated into phylogenetic analyses until a 2020 study by Sebastian Groh and colleagues, which recovered Sutekhsuchus as the sister taxon to Piscogavialis, a marine gryposuchine from the Miocene of Peru. This study further recovered tomistomines and gavialines as entirely separate branches of Crocodilia, something no longer supported by either molecular or morphological evidence. In 2021 Jonathan Rio and Phillip Mannion managed to recover tomistomines and gavialines in a single unified Gavialidae using only morphological evidence. In this study Tomistominae branches off from other gharials after thoracosaurs but before the paraphyletic gryposuchines, not dissimilar to the results later recovered by Burke and colleagues. Rodolfo Salas-Gismondi and colleagues corroborated the placement of this taxon as a derived gavialid more closely related to Gavialis than Tomistoma, though their results differ in other areas (such as the absence of thoracosaurs and the presence of a monophyletic Gryposuchinae). Relevant to Sutekhsuchus, the study found it to be most closely related to the Miocene-Pliocene "Tomistoma" coppensis from East Africa.

In the 2024 study by Burke and colleagues, both the referred Hamilton skull and the original syntype material was used to determine the relation between Sutekhsuchus and other gavialoids. In this study, the analysis was conducted with both equal and implied weighting of the phylogenetic characters, meaning that in one version all traits were regarded as equal while in the other some were assumed to be of greater importance. As a consequence, both trees share the same general layout, but differed in some of the details. Under equal weighting, the modern false gharial clades with gavialoids from the Eocene of Northern Africa and Europe, forming a monophyletic group outside of Gavialinae that does not include many of the species once assigned to it (most of which instead were found to be relatives of Gavialosuchus and Thecachampsa). Sutekhsuchus was found to be much more derived than these forms and appears to have split off from other gavialoids after the East Asian clade formed by Toyotamaphimeia and Hanyusuchus as well as the largely Cretaceous thoracosaurs. This particular analysis suggests that Sutekhsuchus was most closely related to Eogavialis, specifically E. africanum and E. andrewsi, with the latter as the sister taxon to Sutekhsuchus.

Under implied weighting the results are slightly changed. For example, the modern false gharial stands on its own with no close relatives as the basal-most offshoot of Gavialinae, after which the East Asian clade splits off from the subfamily followed by the taxa clustering around Gavialosuchus and Thecachampsa, the opposite order of what is seen under equal weighting. Thoracosaurs remain similar in their position relative to Sutekhsuchus, although the clade is much larger. Following this analysis, Sutekhsuchus continues to be recovered as the closest relative of Eogavialis andrewsi. However, E. africanum was found to diverge after the two, making it more closely related to modern gharial. Burke and colleagues note that if it weren't for the fact that E. africanum and E. andrewsi didn't consistently clade with each other (and the large temporal gap between them), it would have also been a possibility to assign Sutekhsuchus to this genus. In both analyses the most crownward gavialines are those of Neogene South America (gryposuchines) and the genus Gavialis itself. Both phylogenetic trees are shown below.

- Gavialoidea
  - †Maomingosuchus
  - Gavialidae
    - - †Paratomistoma
      - - Tomistoma schlegelii (false gharial)
        - - †Dollosuchoides
          - - †Kentisuchus
            - †Maroccosuchus
    - Gavialinae
      - - - †Gavialosuchus
          - - †"Tomistoma" calaritanum
            - †"Tomistoma" gaudense
        - - †"Tomistoma" lusitanica
          - - †Melitosaurus
            - †Thecachampsa
      - - - †Toyotamaphimeia
          - †Hanyusuchus
        - - †Penghusuchus
          - - †Eosuchus
            - - †"Tomistoma" cairense
              - - - †Thoracosaurus isorhynchus
                  - - †Eothoracosaurus
                    - - †Portugalosuchus
                      - †Thoracosaurus neocesariensis
                - - - †Eogavialis africanum
                    - - †Eogavialis andrewsi
                      - †Sutekhsuchus dowsoni
                  - - †Aktiogavialis
                    - - †Argochampsa
                      - - - - †Dadagavialis
                            - †Piscogavialis
                          - - †Ikanogavialis
                            - †Siquisiquesuchus
                        - - †Gryposuchus pachakamue
                          - - †Gryposuchus colombianus
                            - - †Gryposuchus neogaeus
                              - - †Gryposuchus croizati
                                - - †Gavialis lewisi
                                  - - †Gavialis browni
                                    - Gavialis gangeticus (Indian gharial)

- Gavialoidea
  - - †Maroccosuchus
    - - †Kentisuchus
      - †Dollosuchoides
  - Gavialidae
    - †Maomingosuchus
    - Gavialinae
      - Tomistoma schlegelii (false gharial)
      - - - †Penghusuchus
          - - †Toyotamaphimeia
            - †Hanyusuchus
        - - - †Melitosaurus
            - †Gavialosuchus
            - - †Thecachampsa
              - - †"Tomistoma" lusitanica
                - - †"Tomistoma" calaritanum
                  - †"Tomistoma" gaudense
          - - - - †Paratomistoma
                - †"Tomistoma" cairense
              - - †Thoracosaurus isorhynchus
                - - †Eosuchus
                  - - †Eothoracosaurus
                    - - †Portugalosuchus
                      - †Thoracosaurus neocesariensis
            - - - †Eogavialis andrewsi
                - †Sutekhsuchus dowsoni
              - - †Eogavialis africanum
                - - †Aktiogavialis
                  - - †Argochampsa
                    - - - †Piscogavialis
                        - - †Siquisiquesuchus
                          - †Ikanogavialis
                      - - - †Gryposuchus colombianus
                          - - †Dadagavialis
                            - †Gryposuchus pachakamue
                        - - †Gryposuchus neogaeus
                          - - †Gryposuchus croizati
                            - - †Gavialis lewisi
                              - - †Gavialis browni
                                - Gavialis gangeticus (Indian gharial)

== Paleobiology ==
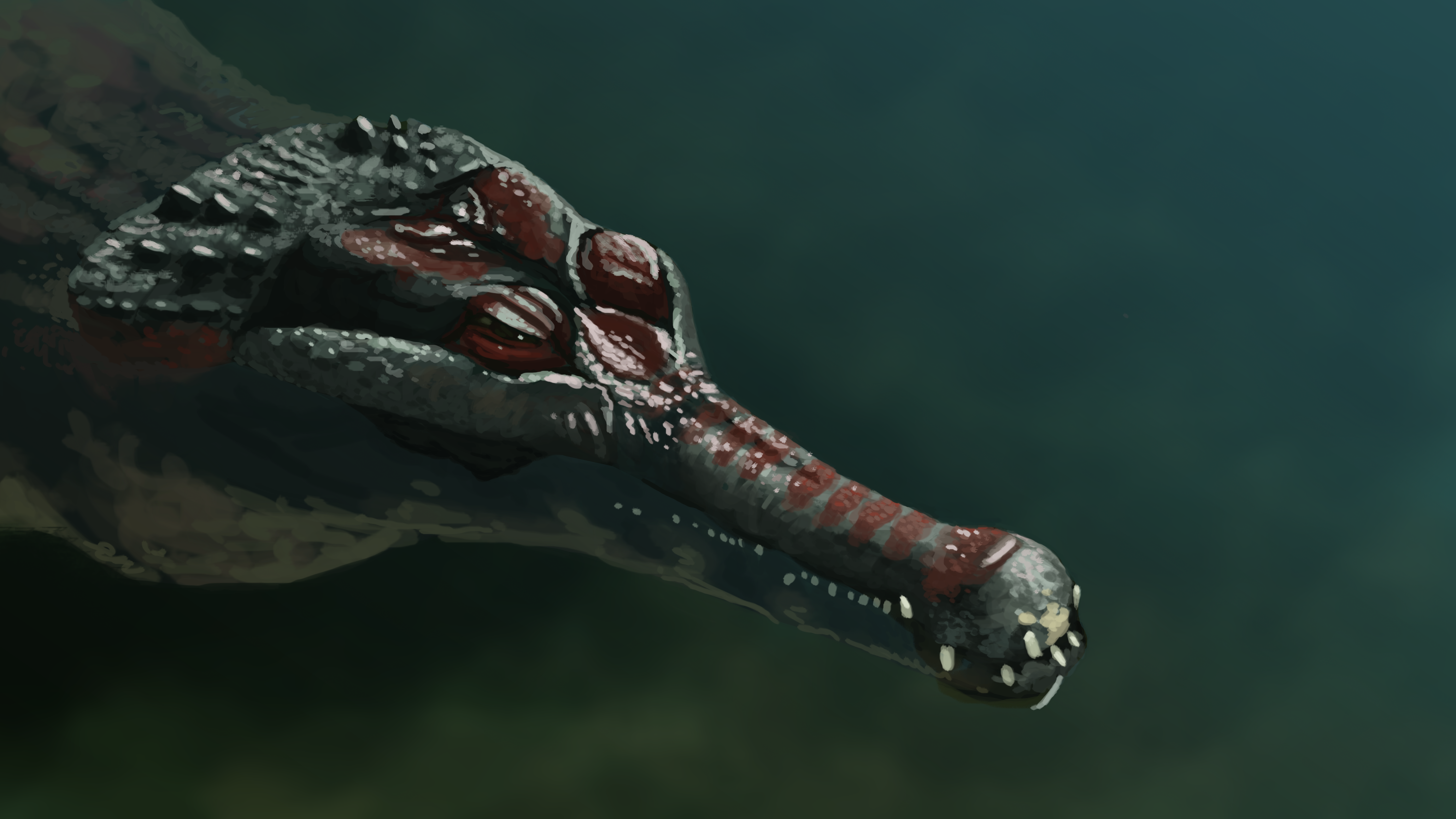
Life reconstruction of Sutekhsuchus downsoni

Sutekhsuchus is known from three Miocene localities spread across the eastern part of North Africa, namely from the Gebel Zelten locality of the Marahda Formation of Libya as well as the Siwa Oasis and Wadi Moghra localities of the Egyptian Moghara Formation. These localities are regarded as roughly contemporary with one another, with Gebel Zelten usually thought to be slightly younger (~17 to 15 Ma) and Wadi Moghra slightly older (~18 to 17 Ma). Nonetheless, both localities share much of their fauna (up to two thirds of the present mammalian taxa) and are typically thought to have been similar environments during the time fossils were deposited there. Both featured a mixture of marine and freshwater components, sharks and rays representing the former and crocodiles, turtles and catfish representing the later. Based on these findings and the geology of the area, it has been proposed that the environment preserved in these localities consisted of slow moving rivers that emptied into the Tethys sea, estuaries and lagoons, likely surrounded by forest. This interpretation is further supported by the mammalian fauna, which features anthracotheres and sanitheriids. The former are commonly associated with rivers and lakes, with some researchers regarding them as ecologically similar to modern hippos, while the latter are often found in swampy and littoral environments.

Both Gebel Zelten and Wadi Moghra are further unified by their diverse crocodilian fauna. In addition to the longirostrine Sutekhsuchus, both localities were home to the robust Rimasuchus and the slender-snouted Euthecodon, both of which are thought to be members of the then widespread Osteolaeminae. An additional fourth taxon, a robust brevirostrine crocodylid of uncertain affinities and distinct from Rimasuchus, is known from Gebel Zelten.

The ratio between the width of the cerebrum and the skull width in Sutekhsuchus is the same as in Argochampsa and most similar to that of Gavialis among modern crocodilians. The morphology of the endosseous labyrinth in Sutekhsuchus is intermediate between the thickened semi-circular canals seen in pelagic crocodylomorphs like the Mesozoic metriorhynchoids and the thin canals seen in terrestrial forms. Within Crocodilia, the canals are similar to those of modern gharials and thinner than those of Argochampsa and Eosuchus, which have been interpreted as inhabiting pelagic biomes more often than other crocodilians. Small depressions in the internal surface of the prefrontal and lacrimal left by the endocast have been interpreted to represent salt glands, allowing for the animal to easily venture into marine biomes.
