= Ocepesuchus =

Ocepesuchus Temporal range: Maastrichtian

Scientific classification
- Domain: Eukaryota
- Kingdom: Animalia
- Phylum: Chordata
- Class: Reptilia
- Clade: Archosauria
- Order: Crocodilia
- Superfamily: Gavialoidea
- Genus: †Ocepesuchus; Jouve et al., 2008

Type species
- †Ocepesuchus eoafricanus Jouve et al., 2008

Extinct genus of reptiles

Ocepesuchus (meaning "Ocepe crocodile", in reference to the OCP, or Office Chérifien des Phosphates, a phosphate-mining company that participated in the excavation of the specimen) is an extinct genus of gavialoid crocodilian, related to modern gharials. Ocepesuchus is the oldest known crocodilian of Africa, and is known only from a single species, O. eoafricanus. It lived in Morocco during the late Maastrichtian age of the Late Cretaceous.

== Discovery and naming ==
Described by Jouve and colleagues in 2008, the type species is O. eoafricanus, with the specific name meaning "dawn African" in reference to its great age relative to other African crocodilians. Ocepesuchus had a long snout with a tubular shape, wider than high. It is the oldest known true crocodilian from Africa. The holotype of Ocepesuchus is OCP DEK-GE 45, a crushed but mostly complete skull, missing the end of the snout and part of its bottom surface, from late Maastrichtian (Late Cretaceous)-age rocks in the Oulad Abdoun Basin, in the vicinity of Khouribga, Morocco.

== Paleobiology ==
Ocepesuchus likely had a piscivorous diet based on its narrow snout, but it wasn't suited for eating large pycnodonts like Phacodus, with the preserved portion of its skull measuring only about 38 cm (15 in) long. The type specimen is interpreted as either a small-sized adult or a subadult, and it may have spent its time in freshwater during its juvenile stages, similar to modern marine crocodiles; if this were indeed the case, some of the juveniles may have been protected to an extent from the Cretaceous–Paleogene extinction event.

== Classification ==
Jouve and colleagues performed a cladistic analysis incorporating their new taxon, and found Ocepesuchus to be a gavialoid. A 2022 phylogenetic study by Iijima et al. recovered Ocepesuchus within Gavialinae, deeply nested within Gavialoidea, as shown in the cladogram below:

- - Crocodyloidea
  - Gavialoidea
    - - †Maroccosuchus zennaroi
      - †Megadontosuchus arduini
      - †Dollosuchoides densmorei
      - †Xaymacachampsa kugleri
      - - †Kentisuchus astrei
        - †Kentisuchus spenceri
    - Gavialidae
      - †Tomistoma cairense
      - †Tomistoma coppensi
      - †Maomingosuchus petrolica
      - Tomistominae
        - Tomistoma schlegelii, false gharial
        - - †Tomistoma lusitanicum
          - - †Gavialosuchus eggenburgensis
            - - †Melitosaurus champsoides
              - †Tomistoma calaritanum
              - †Tomistoma gaudense
              - - †Thecachampsa carolinensis
                - †Thecachampsa antiqua
      - Gavialinae
        - †Paratomistoma courti
        - - - †Penghusuchus pani
            - - †Toyotamaphimeia machikanensis
              - †Hanyusuchus sinensis
          - - - †Eosuchus lerichei
              - †Eosuchus minor
            - - †Ocepesuchus eoafricanus
              - - †Eothoracosaurus mississippiensis
                - - †Thoracosaurus macrorhynchus
                  - †Thoracosaurus neocesariensis
              - - †Aktiogavialis puertoricensis
                - †Eogavialis africanum
                - - †Argochampsa krebsi
                  - - †Piscogavialis jugaliperforatus
                    - - †Ikanogavialis gameroi
                      - - †Siquisiquesuchus venezuelensis
                        - - †Dadagavialis gunai
                          - - †Gryposuchus neogaeus
                            - †Gryposuchus croizati
                            - - †Aktiogavialis caribesi
                              - †Gryposuchus pachakamue
                          - - †Gryposuchus colombianus
                            - †Rhamphosuchus crassidens
                            - †Myanmar gavialid
                            - †Gavialis lewisi
                            - †Gavialis bengawanicus
                            - - Gavialis gangeticus, gharial
                              - †Siwalik Gavialis
