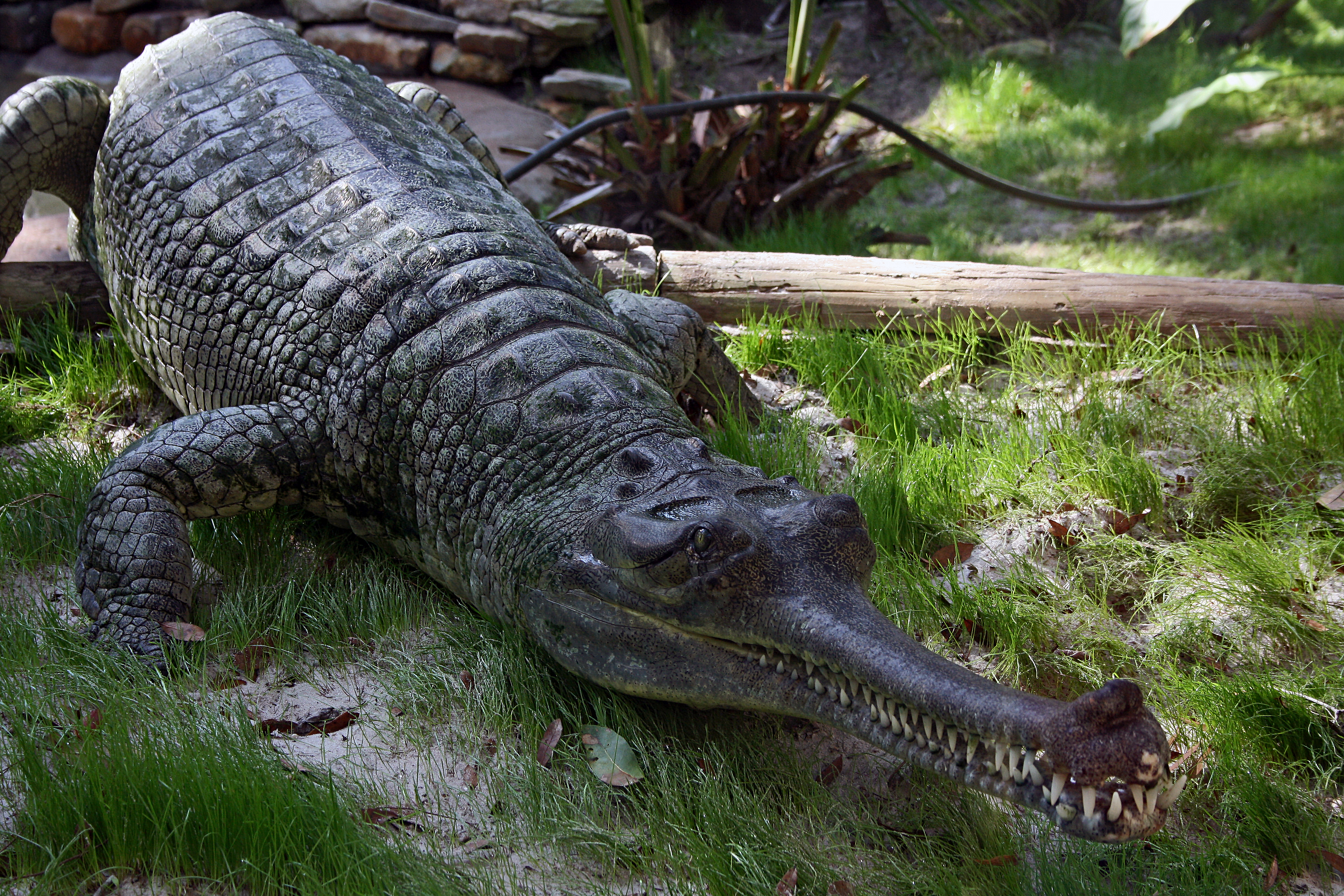
- Indian gharial, Gavialis gangeticus
- Hanyusuchus

Scientific classification
- Kingdom: Animalia
- Phylum: Chordata
- Class: Reptilia
- Clade: Archosauria
- Order: Crocodilia
- Family: Gavialidae
- Subfamily: Gavialinae; Nopcsa, 1923

Genera
- †Aktiogavialis; †Argochampsa?; †Dadagavialis; †Eogavialis?; †Eosuchus?; †Eothoracosaurus?; Gavialis; †Gavialosuchus?; †Gryposuchus; †Hanyusuchus; †Harpacochampsa?; †Hesperogavialis; †Ikanogavialis; †Maomingosuchus?; †Ocepesuchus; †Paratomistoma?; †Penghusuchus; †Piscogavialis; †Rhamphosuchus; †Siquisiquesuchus; †Sutekhsuchus; †Thoracosaurus?; †Toyotamaphimeia

= Gavialinae =

Gavialinae Temporal range: Early Miocene-recent, 20–0 Ma Possible Late Cretaceous records, but see

Subfamily of gharial crocodylians

Gavialinae is a subfamily of large semiaquatic crocodilian reptiles, resembling crocodiles, but with much thinner snouts. Gavialinae is one of the two major subfamilies within the family Gavialidae - the other being the subfamily Tomistominae, which contains the false gharial and extinct relatives.

== Classification ==
Gavialinae was first proposed by Nopcsa in 1923, and was cladistically defined by Brochu in 2003 as Gavialis gangeticus (the gharial) and all crocodylians more closely related to it than to Tomistoma schlegelii (the false gharial). This is a stem-based definition for gavialinae, and means that it includes more basal extinct gavialine ancestors that are more closely related to the gharial than to the false gharial.

The false gharial was once thought to be only distantly related to the gharial despite its similar appearance. The false gharial and other tomistomines were traditionally classified within the superfamily Crocodyloidea as close relatives of crocodiles, based solely on morphological evidence. However, recent molecular studies using DNA sequencing have found that they are in fact more closely related to each other than any other extant (living) crocodilian.

The placement of extinct gavialids between Gavialinae and Tomistominae is unresolved.

The below cladogram is from the 2022 Iijima et al. study:

- - Crocodyloidea
  - Gavialoidea
    - - †Maroccosuchus zennaroi
      - †Megadontosuchus arduini
      - †Dollosuchoides densmorei
      - †Xaymacachampsa kugleri
      - - †Kentisuchus astrei
        - †Kentisuchus spenceri
    - Gavialidae
      - †Tomistoma cairense
      - †Tomistoma coppensi
      - †Maomingosuchus petrolica
      - Tomistominae
        - Tomistoma schlegelii, false gharial
        - - †Tomistoma lusitanicum
          - - †Gavialosuchus eggenburgensis
            - - †Melitosaurus champsoides
              - †Tomistoma calaritanum
              - †Tomistoma gaudense
              - - †Thecachampsa carolinensis
                - †Thecachampsa antiqua
      - Gavialinae
        - †Paratomistoma courti
        - - - †Penghusuchus pani
            - - †Toyotamaphimeia machikanensis
              - †Hanyusuchus sinensis
          - - - †Eosuchus lerichei
              - †Eosuchus minor
            - - †Ocepesuchus eoafricanus
              - - †Eothoracosaurus mississippiensis
                - - †Thoracosaurus macrorhynchus
                  - †Thoracosaurus neocesariensis
              - - †Aktiogavialis puertoricensis
                - †Eogavialis africanum
                - - †Argochampsa krebsi
                  - - †Piscogavialis jugaliperforatus
                    - - †Ikanogavialis gameroi
                      - - †Siquisiquesuchus venezuelensis
                        - - †Dadagavialis gunai
                          - - †Gryposuchus neogaeus
                            - †Gryposuchus croizati
                            - - †Aktiogavialis caribesi
                              - †Gryposuchus pachakamue
                          - - †Gryposuchus colombianus
                            - †Rhamphosuchus crassidens
                            - †Myanmar gavialid
                            - †Gavialis lewisi
                            - †Gavialis bengawanicus
                            - - Gavialis gangeticus, gharial
                              - †Siwalik Gavialis
