= Hanyusuchus =

Hanyusuchus Temporal range: Holocene
- Life restoration of Hanyusuchus sinensis

Conservation status
- Extinct (c. 15th century)

Scientific classification
- Kingdom: Animalia
- Phylum: Chordata
- Class: Reptilia
- Order: Crocodylia
- Family: Gavialidae
- Subfamily: Gavialinae
- Genus: †Hanyusuchus; Iijima et al., 2022

Type species
- †Hanyusuchus sinensis Iijima et al., 2022

Extinct genus of reptiles

Hanyusuchus, the chinese gharial, is an extinct genus of gavialid crocodilian native to South China, containing a single species, Hanyusuchus sinensis. Reaching a total body length of 5.43–6.19 metres (17.8–20.3 ft), it shares characteristics of both tomistomines and derived gharials, such as a possibly sexually dimorphic vocal structure. Hanyusuchus is a recent Holocene taxon, living in southern China from at least the 4th millennium BC (during the Bronze Age) to as late as the 15th century AD, perhaps even later, when increased efforts of government culling and habitat destruction likely led to its extinction.

== Discovery and naming ==
Subfossils of Hanyusuchus were initially discovered between February 1963 and February 1980, with a total of six specimens, ranging from skulls to postcrania and osteoderms, being known. These, however, were dismissed as belonging to a modern genus and forgotten for the following years. Eventually, the bones were recognized as belonging to a unique genus and described as such by Masaya Iijima and colleagues in 2022. Hanyusuchus is named after Han Yu (768–824), a Chinese poet and government official active during the Tang dynasty. After a rash of crocodile attacks on humans and livestock, Han Yu issued a proclamation in which he instructed the crocodiles to leave the area or be killed. The second part of the name derives from the Greek soûkhos, meaning crocodile. The species name, "sinensis", is a commonly-used epithet in taxonomy meaning "from China".

== Description ==
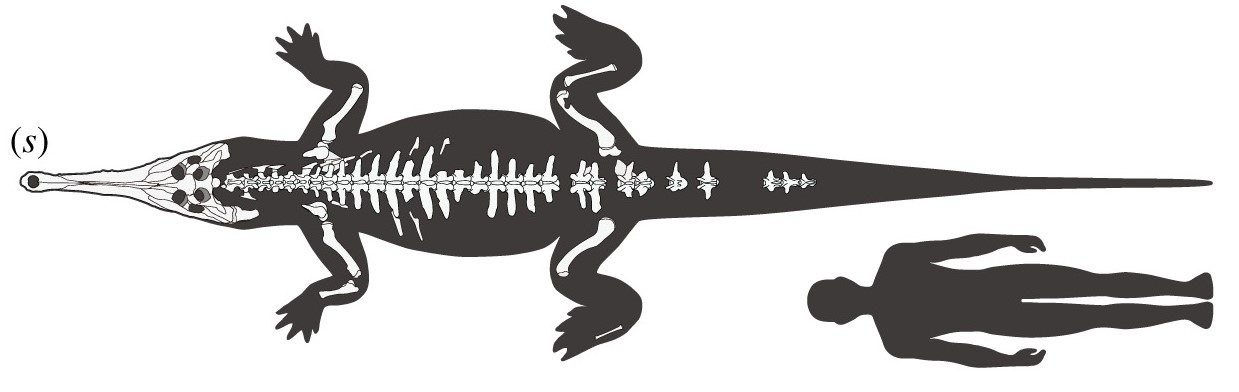
Skeleton compared in size to a human

Hanyusuchus is a large, slender-snouted crocodilian, generally resembling the modern false gharial. Each premaxilla contains five teeth, followed by sixteen teeth in each maxilla. The dentary bears eighteen teeth. The pterygoid bone of Hanyusuchus is occupied by a series of enlarged sinuses thought to be homologous to the enlarged posterior chamber of the pterygoid bulla seen in extant gharials. The structure, however, is expanded towards the back of the skull in a novel way, increasing the morphological variety of the bulla. However, as parts of the palate are broken in Hanyusuchus, it cannot be determined whether or not it had the anterior chamber. These chambers are internally connected to the nasopharyngeal duct and, depending on the length of the chambers, are used to change the harmonics of vocalisations. In modern gharials, the pterygoid bulla is tied to ontogeny and sexual maturity in males and coupled with the growth of a soft tissue structure (ghara). In combination, the bulla serves to alter sounds, while the ghara exaggerates it, which is used in attracting mates. Although no indication for a ghara is described Hanyusuchus, the enlarged sinuses show a clear adaptation towards an acoustic function. This is supported by contemporary descriptions telling of crocodiles making "thunder-like sounds in the night".

Both the holotype and one of the paratypes indicate that they had reached full sexual maturity. The known specimens vary in total body length between 5.43–6.19 m (17.8–20.3 ft). Historical reports likewise indicate the presence of 6 m (20 ft) long crocodilians in South China.

Historical records dating to the years 849 and 1040 describe the crocodiles living in South China as being brownish yellow in colour, sometimes deep green, and occasionally white. Young animals were described as yellow to white. However, such records may not be entirely reliable.

== Distribution ==
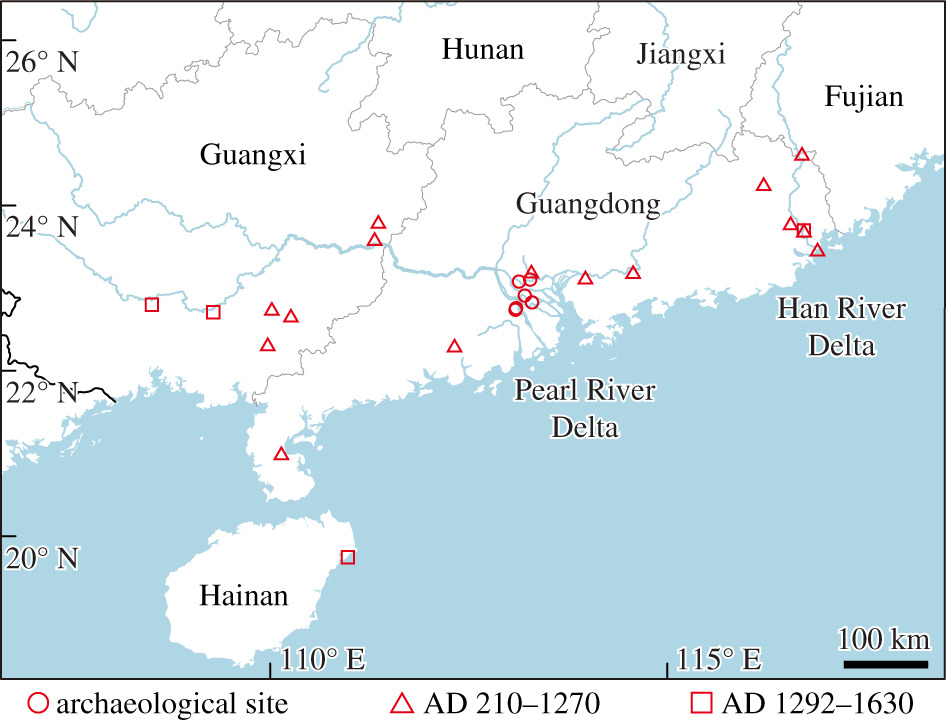
Hanyusuchus range map

Subfossil evidence and historic documents all indicate that Hanyusuchus inhabited what is now South China, with subfossils found in Jiangmen and Foshan (Guangdong District). Much of the known material has been subjected to accelerator mass spectrometry radiocarbon dating, revealing their age to roughly correlate with the Bronze Age approximately 3300 to 2900 BP. The osteoderms were not analyzed by Iijima and colleagues; however, older research estimated their age to be 5000 to 4900 BP. Historic reports are notably more recent, dating from the Han dynasty (specifically 210–127) to possibly as recent as the Ming dynasty (ca. 1630). The reports gathered from South China indicate their presence ranging from at least Nanning in the west to the Han River delta in the east. Reports are also known from the northern parts of Hainan Island.

== In culture ==
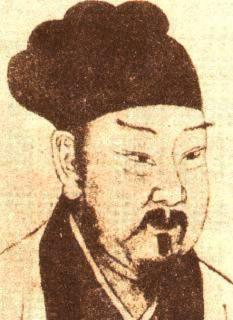
Han Yu

Iijima and colleagues present a series of historical records from Southern China believed to relate to Hanyusuchus. The first of these reports stems from Bu Zhi, who was sent to Jiaozhou as a governor and noted the presence of various animals in the waters around Guangzhou, including the Chinese alligator as well as a different type of crocodilian. During the Three Kingdoms period, crocodilians were said to be raised in a moat around a castle south of Wuzhou. Contemporary reports liken them to Chinese alligators, but notably larger (6 meters). They fed on fish, deer, and occasionally humans, with criminals being occasionally fed to them. Stories from the late 200s and early 300s tell of repeated conflicts with humans, describing them being killed and their heads dried, which is consistent with pathologies recovered from Bronze Age individuals. Reports then continue from the year 810 onward, again describing crocodilians attacking and killing humans and livestock in Ting River. In 819, the poet and politician Han Yu, after whom Hanyusuchus was named, demanded that the crocodiles leave the waters of the Han River delta and Bad Creek (named for repeated crocodile attacks). He is said to have sacrificed a pig and a goat to them before making his demands and threatening to kill them with poisoned arrows should they not comply. Reports from 849 describe in more detail the life appearance of the native crocodiles while also telling of their supposed hunting behavior. Another story of the time tells of Li Deyu, then governor of Chaozhou, losing precious books and drawings as crocodilians attacked his boat. Documents from the Tang and Song dynasty note the names given to the crocodilians of South China, referring to them as Hulei (忽雷) or Gulei (骨雷) and eyu (鱷魚) or zha (鮓) in the south. These stories also preserve some of the mythology around them, telling of crocodiles changing into tigers in autumn. Following stories continue reporting about crocodiles attacking humans, boats, cattle, and deer; and tell of different bodies of water all named for their abundance of crocodiles. These stories again emphasize the great size of the responsible animals, differentiating them from the small Chinese Alligator. One of the most detailed attacks on humans was documented in 999, when a 10-year-old child named Zhang was killed. In response, soldiers were sent to the area by Chen Yaozuo, captured crocodiles with nets fashioned from horsetail ropes, and killed them publicly after announcing their crimes. Around 400 years later, Xia Yuanji ordered the death of crocodiles in Hanjiang, for which calcium oxide was spread over the water. Reports from 1461 tell of a "crocodile cave" east of Hengzhou and the last historical report Iijima and colleagues associate with Hanyusuchus dates to 1630, when wine and animals were sacrificed to crocodilians on Hainan Island.

Evidence of hostility between humans and crocodiles is not exclusive to literature, either. One of the paratypes of Hanyusuchus, XM 12–1557, preserves seventeen chop marks, the majority of which are found over the skull and one on the occipital condyle. The vertical chop marks are shown to be narrow but deep, and some pathologies with different orientations might correspond with attacks by other people or a simple change in position. Another paratype, SM E1623, shows a prominent chop mark that indicates that the 4th cervical vertebrae had been bisected by a sharp weapon in a single blow (however, it is deemed likely that it nonetheless took several hits to the soft tissue before the bone was split). The cuts to the head were interpreted to be clear signs of humans attacking the crocodile's head with the intention of killing it, while the injuries towards the back of the head (occipital condyle and cervical vertebrae) indicate postmortem decapitation, which is in line with historical reports describing crocodile heads being dried. The exact orientation of the chops inflicted upon the neck furthermore shows that they were made with precision, aiming at a gap between the postoccipital and nuchal armor. The age of these specimens corresponds with the Chinese Bronze Age (Shang and Zhou dynasty, 14th to 10th century BC), making bronze axes a likely weapon used in the attacks. The extinction of Hanyusuchus was likely a combination of continued habitat destruction by local farmers, in combination with targeted killings supported by the government of the time. Subsequently, the crocodiles, previously native to many of the river systems feeding into the ocean, were gradually pushed into smaller and smaller habitats until their eventual extinction. Climate change, although factoring into the demise of many of the Asian megafauna, is not considered a major aspect of these events given Hanyusuchus' survival into historic times.

== Phylogeny ==
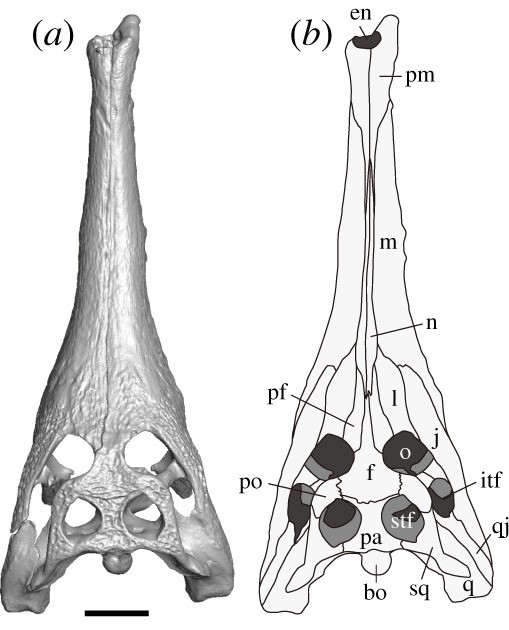
A skull of Hanyusuchus

Although superficially resembling more traditional tomistomines, the excellent preservation of Hanyusuchus allowed researchers to identify a series of traits associated with more derived members of Gavialidae. This mosaic of features suggests that Hanyusuchus, alongside other closely related genera, forms a sort of transitional form from basal "tomistomines" to derived gavialines.

- - Crocodyloidea
  - Gavialoidea
    - - †Maroccosuchus zennaroi
      - †Megadontosuchus arduini
      - †Dollosuchoides densmorei
      - †Xaymacachampsa kugleri
      - - †Kentisuchus astrei
        - †Kentisuchus spenceri
    - Gavialidae
      - †Tomistoma cairense
      - †Tomistoma coppensi
      - †Maomingosuchus petrolica
      - Tomistominae
        - Tomistoma schlegelii, false gharial
        - - †Tomistoma lusitanicum
          - - †Gavialosuchus eggenburgensis
            - - †Melitosaurus champsoides
              - †Tomistoma calaritanum
              - †Tomistoma gaudense
              - - †Thecachampsa carolinensis
                - †Thecachampsa antiqua
      - Gavialinae
        - †Paratomistoma courti
        - - - †Penghusuchus pani
            - - †Toyotamaphimeia machikanensis
              - †Hanyusuchus sinensis
          - - - †Eosuchus lerichei
              - †Eosuchus minor
            - - †Ocepesuchus eoafricanus
              - - †Eothoracosaurus mississippiensis
                - - †Thoracosaurus macrorhynchus
                  - †Thoracosaurus neocesariensis
              - - †Aktiogavialis puertoricensis
                - †Eogavialis africanum
                - - †Argochampsa krebsi
                  - - †Piscogavialis jugaliperforatus
                    - - †Ikanogavialis gameroi
                      - - †Siquisiquesuchus venezuelensis
                        - - †Dadagavialis gunai
                          - - †Gryposuchus neogaeus
                            - †Gryposuchus croizati
                            - - †Aktiogavialis caribesi
                              - †Gryposuchus pachakamue
                          - - †Gryposuchus colombianus
                            - †Rhamphosuchus crassidens
                            - †Myanmar gavialid
                            - †Gavialis lewisi
                            - †Gavialis bengawanicus
                            - - Gavialis gangeticus, gharial
                              - †Siwalik Gavialis
