= Melitosaurus =

Melitosaurus Temporal range: Miocene, 23.03–20.43 Ma

Scientific classification
- Domain: Eukaryota
- Kingdom: Animalia
- Phylum: Chordata
- Class: Reptilia
- Clade: Archosauria
- Order: Crocodilia
- Family: Gavialidae
- Subfamily: Tomistominae
- Genus: †Melitosaurus; Owen, 1850

Species
- †Melitosaurus champsoides Owen, 1850 (type)

Species of reptile (fossil)

Melitosaurus is an extinct genus of gavialid crocodylian discovered in Gozo, Malta in Early Miocene Aquitanian stage marine limestone rock in 1850. It is related to the extant (living) False gharial and a member of the same subfamily Tomistominae, as shown in the cladogram below:

- - Crocodyloidea
  - Gavialoidea
    - - †Maroccosuchus zennaroi
      - †Megadontosuchus arduini
      - †Dollosuchoides densmorei
      - †Xaymacachampsa kugleri
      - - †Kentisuchus astrei
        - †Kentisuchus spenceri
    - Gavialidae
      - †Tomistoma cairense
      - †Tomistoma coppensi
      - †Maomingosuchus petrolica
      - Tomistominae
        - Tomistoma schlegelii, false gharial
        - - †Tomistoma lusitanicum
          - - †Gavialosuchus eggenburgensis
            - - †Melitosaurus champsoides
              - †Tomistoma calaritanum
              - †Tomistoma gaudense
              - - †Thecachampsa carolinensis
                - †Thecachampsa antiqua
      - Gavialinae
        - †Paratomistoma courti
        - - - †Penghusuchus pani
            - - †Toyotamaphimeia machikanensis
              - †Hanyusuchus sinensis
          - - - †Eosuchus lerichei
              - †Eosuchus minor
            - - †Ocepesuchus eoafricanus
              - - †Eothoracosaurus mississippiensis
                - - †Thoracosaurus macrorhynchus
                  - †Thoracosaurus neocesariensis
              - - †Aktiogavialis puertoricensis
                - †Eogavialis africanum
                - - †Argochampsa krebsi
                  - - †Piscogavialis jugaliperforatus
                    - - †Ikanogavialis gameroi
                      - - †Siquisiquesuchus venezuelensis
                        - - †Dadagavialis gunai
                          - - †Gryposuchus neogaeus
                            - †Gryposuchus croizati
                            - - †Aktiogavialis caribesi
                              - †Gryposuchus pachakamue
                          - - †Gryposuchus colombianus
                            - †Rhamphosuchus crassidens
                            - †Myanmar gavialid
                            - †Gavialis lewisi
                            - †Gavialis bengawanicus
                            - - Gavialis gangeticus, gharial
                              - †Siwalik Gavialis
