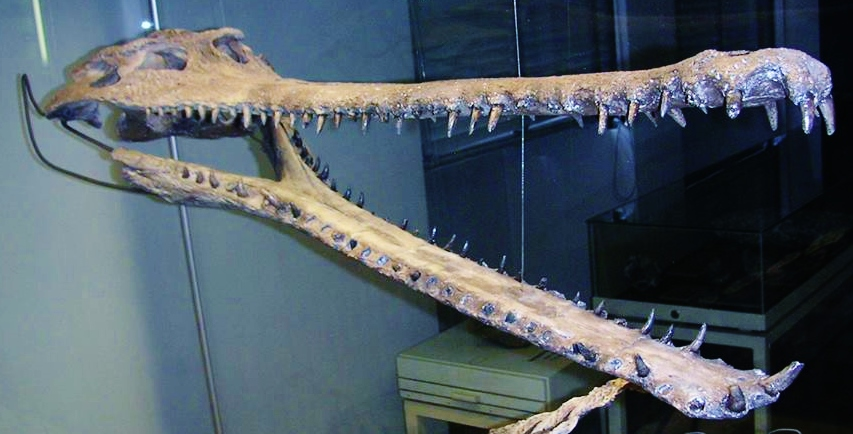
- Skull of Piscogavialis jugaliperforatus

Scientific classification
- Kingdom: Animalia
- Phylum: Chordata
- Class: Reptilia
- Order: Crocodilia
- Family: Gavialidae
- Subfamily: †Gryposuchinae; Vélez-Juarbe et al., 2007

Genera
- †Aktiogavialis; †Dadagavialis; †Gryposuchus; †Hesperogavialis; †Ikanogavialis; †Piscogavialis; †Siquisiquesuchus

= Gryposuchinae =

Gryposuchinae Temporal range: Middle Oligocene - Holocene, 28–0.117 Ma

Extinct subfamily of reptiles

Gryposuchinae is an extinct subfamily of gavialid crocodylians. Gryposuchines lived mainly in the Miocene of South America. However, "Ikanogavialis" papuensis may have survived more recently, into the Late Pleistocene/Holocene. Most were long-snouted coastal forms. The group was named in 2007 and includes genera such as Gryposuchus and Aktiogavialis, although a 2018 study indicates that the group might be paraphyletic and rather an evolutionary grade towards the gharial.

== Description ==
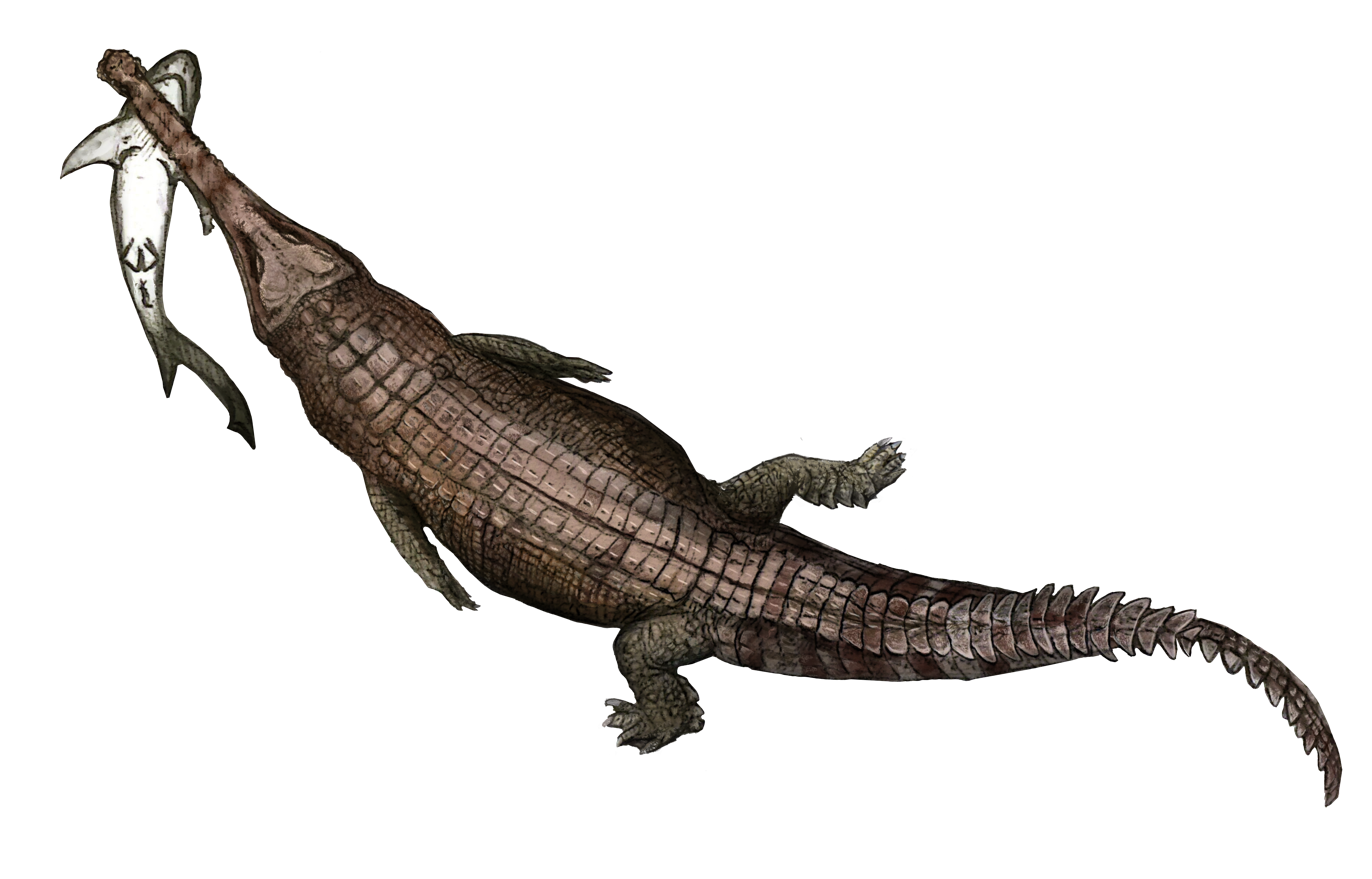
Life restoration of Gryposuchus pachakamue, a large Gryposuchine from the Pebas Formation.

Gryposuchines had long, narrow snouts and most had protruding eye sockets. One distinguishing feature of the group is the lack of a large exposure of the prootic bone around the trigeminal foramen, a hole in the side of the braincase wall. Many Gryposuchines reached exceptionally large sizes, and are among the largest crocodilians ever described, with general like Gryposuchus containing individuals estimated to reach 10 meters.

== Classification ==
Gryposuchinae was named in 2007 as a subfamily of closely related gavialid crocodilians. It was cladistically defined as a stem-based taxon including Gryposuchus jessei and all crocodilians more closely related to it than to Gavialis gangeticus (the gharial) or Tomistoma schlegelii (the False gharial). The tomistomines (including the living false gharial) were long thought to be classified as crocodiles and not closely related to gavialoids. However, recent molecular studies using DNA sequencing have consistently indicated that the false gharial (Tomistoma) (and by inference other related extinct forms in Tomistominae) actually belong to Gavialoidea (and Gavialidae).

A phylogenetic analysis conducted in the 2007 study found Gryposuchinae to include the genera Aktiogavialis, Gryposuchus, Ikanogavialis, Piscogavialis, and Siquisiquesuchus. The below cladogram is from the 2007 analysis showing the phylogenetic relationships of gryposuchines among gavialoids. Hesperogavialis was excluded due to a lack of skull material, and Dadagavialis due to its 2018 discovery.

- Gavialoidea
  - Eothoracosaurus
  - - Thoracosaurus
    - - Eosuchus
      - Argochampsa
      - Gavialidae
        - Eogavialis
        - - Gavialis
          - Gryposuchinae
            - Ikanogavialis
            - Piscogavialis
            - Siquisiquesuchus
            - Gryposuchus
            - Aktiogavialis

Alternatively, phylogenetic studies recovering the tomistomines (including the living false gharial) within Gavialidae have indicated that the members of Gryposuchinae and the genus Gryposuchus may in fact be paraphyletic and rather an evolutionary grade towards Gavialis and the gharial, as shown in the cladogram below:

- Gavialidae
  - Tomistominae
    - Paratomistoma courti†
    - Tomistoma schlegelii False gharial
  - - Toyotamaphimeia machikanensis†
    - - Penghusuchus pani†
      - - - "Tomistoma" cairense†
          - - Thoracosaurus isorhynchus†
            - - Eosuchus lerichei†
              - Eosuchus minor†
        - - - Portugalosuchus azenhae†
            - - Eothoracosaurus mississippiensis†
              - Thoracosaurus neocesariensis†
          - - "Tomistoma" dowsoni†
            - - Eogavialis africanum†
              - - Aktiogavialis caribesi†
                - - Argochampsa krebsi†
                  - - - Piscogavialis jugaliperforatus†
                      - - Ikanogavialis gameroi†
                        - Siquisiquesuchus venezuelensis†
                    - - Dadagavialis gunai†
                      - - "Gryposuchinae"
                          - Gryposuchus colombianus†
                          - Gryposuchus pachakamue†
                        - - Gryposuchus neogaeus†
                          - - Gryposuchus croizati†
                            - - Gavialis lewisi†
                              - - Gavialis browni†
                                - Gavialis gangeticus Gharial

== Paleobiology ==
The subfamily Gryposuchinae are the sole members of the superfamily Gavialoidea to occupy South America, the duration of which is entirely limited to the Miocene. However, although most of their history is recorded on the continent, dispersion was achieved via a prior presence in the Caribbean (Aktiogavialis, the oldest known gryposuchine, from in the Middle Oligocene of Puerto Rico, and Dadagavialis in the Early Miocene of Panama, respectively). Furthermore, indeterminate gavialoid remains have recovered from the Oligo-Miocene boundary of coastal Brazil. The origin of these gryposuchines is unclear, although traditionally, an African origin has been favoured as gavialids would have been more likely to cross the Atlantic Ocean than the longer expanses of the Pacific Ocean. Moreover, warm equatorial currents run across the Atlantic from Africa to the Americas, assisting in travel.

Gryposuchus, Ikanogavialis and Siquisiquesuchus represent the first known members of Gryposuchinae in Early Miocene of South America, colonizing around Colombia and Venezuela. Additionally, indeterminate finds of gavialoids (all in either coastal or marine sediments) are present in early Miocene Jimol Formation and for the early/middle Miocene Castilletes Formation in Colombia, and from the Oligo-Miocene boundary Pirabas Formation of coastal Brazil, Gryposuchus and Ikanogavialis persist into the Middle Miocene, with the freshwater-adapting Gryposuchus expanding throughout the Pebas mega-wetlands into inland Peru and Argentina. In the Late Miocene, Gryposuchinae diversity explodes, with Gryposuchus and Ikanogavialis being joined by Hesperogavialis, of Venezuela and Brazil, Piscogavialis of coastal Peru, and Aktiogavialis, re-appearing in the fossil record once more, also in Venezuela. At this point, five of the seven genera are present in the Late Miocene, with four genera overlapping in the Urumaco Formation of Venezuela alone, a particular hotspot for crocodilian diversity in the Miocene. Based on the deposits in which they were found, most genera of gryposuchines were solely estuarine, coastal or marine-dwelling; only the genera Gryposuchus and Hesperogavialis had some level of freshwater presence. On the flipside, whereas most gryposuchines were restricted to a certain coastal region and time period, Gryposuchus enjoyed a continent wide distribution, spread from Andeo-Venezuelan drainage basin to Argentina from the Middle Miocene onwards. Additionally, whereas the other genera had one or two species each, Gryposuchus had five, one of which (G. croizati) was the largest of the superfamily on record, at an estimated length of 10m.

At the Miocene/Pliocene boundary, all gryposuchines, and thus the entire superfamily of Gavialoidea, along with the first wave of crocodyloids (Brasilosuchus and Charactosuchus, which also colonized during the Miocene) were likely extirpated from South America, with Caimaninae undergoing a severe reduction in size and diversity as well. This was likely due to the continuing elevation of the northern sections of the Andes chain reshaping the future Amazonian drainage system, re-rerouting flow to the Venezuelan Caribbean to the much cooler Atlantic, and transforming the mega-wetlands into a fully developed riverine system. The co-current aridification of the continental interior, and isolation of the peripheral wetland basins, also restricted the space and food resources of these large, food intensive specialist crocodilians, and has thus also been suggested as an essential factor in their extinction. Several other gavialid taxa also went extinct globally, suggesting a major global climate change event. However, there may be evidence that Piscogavialis survived this mass extinction, persisting on the Pacific coast of Pliocene Peru for a few million more years. Furthermore, crocodyloids would recolonize South America via the African Crocodylus in the early Pliocene, whereas gryposuchines would only re-appear in the fossil record six million years later, as "Ikanogavialis" papuensis, in the Late Pleistocene/Holocene marine sediments of the Woodlark Island, in the Solomon Sea. Separated by a geographical barrier of at least 10,000 km, this gavialoid had presumably reached Melanesia in a similar fashion as Brachylophus and Lapitiguana iguanas, being carried by Pacific oceanic currents. Found in association with dugongs and sea turtles, "Ikanogavialis" papuensis was a marine animal like its ancestors, a 2-3 meter long coastal piscivore so far known only from Murua. Like other Pleistocene gharials, the species was presumably hunted to extinction by humanity.
