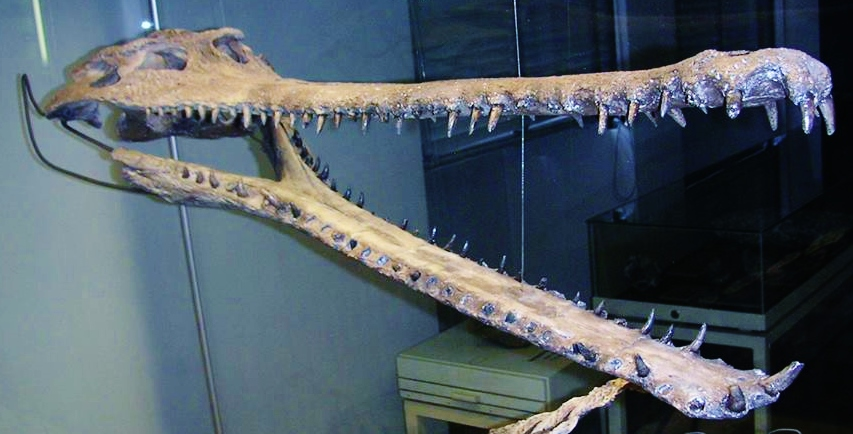
- Skull of P. jugaliperforatus
- Skull diagram of different known specimens

Scientific classification
- Kingdom: Animalia
- Phylum: Chordata
- Class: Reptilia
- Order: Crocodylia
- Family: Gavialidae
- Subfamily: †Gryposuchinae
- Genus: †Piscogavialis; Kraus 1998

Type species
- †Piscogavialis jugaliperforatus Kraus 1998

Other species
- †P. laberintoensis Zamora-Vega et al., 2025

= Piscogavialis =

Piscogavialis Temporal range: Late Miocene, 11.6–5.3 Ma

Extinct genus of reptiles

Piscogavialis is an extinct genus of gryposuchine gavialid crocodylian. Two species have been described, the type species P. jugaliperforatus and P. laberintoensis. Fossils of Piscogavialis have been found from the Mio-Pliocene Pisco Formation of the Sacaco Basin in southern Peru in 1998, where it coexisted with the much smaller gavialid Sacacosuchus.

Piscogavialis represents some of the best preserved gavialid material known from South America. The holotype skull is preserved in three dimensions and is nearly complete. A mandible and some postcranial material have also been found in association with the skull. Several important features of the occipital region of the skull support a referral to the family Gavialidae, which also includes the extant gharial and false gharial.

== Paleobiology ==
Size comparison of different specimens of Piscogavialis

The strata from which remains of Piscogavialis have been found suggest that it lived in a coastal environment. Another smaller extinct marine gavialid, Sacacosuchus, was described in 2022 and discovered in the same formation.

During the Miocene, what is now the Pisco Basin in Peru was largely covered by a shallow marine transgression that connected to the open ocean. The environment was marked by shallow waters, protected bays with rocky shores and small islands. The south-east Pacific coast was inhabited by at least two species of crocodilians, Piscogavialis and Sacacosuchus, throughout most of this time period. The remains of both species were found alongside other animals typical for the marine environments of this region including various cetaceans, seals, seabirds, marine sloths and sharks. As the Peruvian sediments yielded bones of both adults and juvenile specimens, it is assumed that Sacacosuchus spent its entire life in saltwater. Although Piscogavialis was notably larger, it was also likely more specialized, feeding primarily on fast fish. Sacacosuchus, meanwhile, in spite of being only half the length of its contemporary relative, was adapted to a more generalist diet.

During the Miocene, environmental factors worked together to highly favor marine gavialoids, in particular warm temperatures and abundant shallow water coastal environments suited to their lifestyle. Subsequently, their diversity was high during most of this time period with their range extending as far south as Chile. However, despite these initially favorable conditions, global temperatures continuously dropped throughout the late Neogene. Initially, both Piscogavialis and Sacacosuchus weren't heavily affected, with the water temperatures of their habitat continuing to support these ectotherms until at least the end of the Miocene period. Eventually, however, the extinction of Peru's marine gavialids was brought on by the disruption of these coastal ecosystems, caused by dropping sea levels and the uplifting of the Andes Mountains, coupled with the more drastically dropping global temperatures of the Pliocene.

== Phylogeny ==
A phylogenetic analysis conducted in a 2007 study found Gryposuchinae to include the genera Aktiogavialis, Gryposuchus, Ikanogavialis, Piscogavialis, and Siquisiquesuchus. Below is a cladogram from the 2007 analysis showing the phylogenetic relationships of gryposuchines among gavialoids:

- Gavialoidea
  - Eothoracosaurus
  - - Thoracosaurus
    - - Eosuchus
      - Argochampsa
      - Gavialidae
        - Eogavialis
        - - Gavialis
          - Gryposuchinae
            - Ikanogavialis
            - Piscogavialis
            - Siquisiquesuchus
            - Gryposuchus
            - Aktiogavialis

Alternatively, a 2018 tip dating study by Lee & Yates simultaneously using morphological, molecular (DNA sequencing), and stratigraphic (fossil age) data indicated that the members of Gryposuchinae may in fact be paraphyletic and rather an evolutionary grade towards Gavialis and the gharial, as shown in the cladogram below:

- Gavialidae
  - - - - - - - - Gavialis gangeticus Gharial
                - Gavialis bengawanicus†
              - Gavialis browni†
            - Gryposuchus colombianus†
          - Ikanogavialis†
        - - Gryposuchus pachakamue†
          - Piscogavialis†
      - Harpacochampsa†
    - - - Toyotamaphimeia†
        - Penghusuchus†
      - Gavialosuchus†
  - - Tomistoma lusitanicum†
    - Tomistoma schlegelii False gharial

The below cladogram is from the 2022 Salas-Gismondi et al. study describing the newly discovered co-existing Sacacosuchus, and shows Piscogavialis as a more derived member of Gavialidae:

- - Crocodyloidea
  - Gavialoidea
    - †Kentisuchus spenceri
    - - †Dollosuchoides densmorei
      - - †Maroccosuchus zennaroi
        - - †Maomingosuchus petrolica
          - Gavialidae
            - Tomistoma schlegelii, false gharial
            - - †Tomistoma lusitanicum
              - - †Gavialosuchus eggenburgensis
                - †Sacacosuchus cordovai
                - - †Thecachampsa antiqua
                  - - †Thecachampsa carolinensis
                    - †Thecachampsa americana
                - - - †Tomistoma dowsoni
                    - †Tomistoma coppensi
                  - - †Tomistoma cairense
                    - - †Paratomistoma courti
                      - - †MUSM 1513
                        - - †Argochampsa krebsi
                          - - †Aktiogavialis caribesi
                            - †Aktiogavialis puertoricensis
                          - - - †Eogavialis
                              - - †Gavialis bengawanicus
                                - Gavialis gangeticus, gharial
                                - †Siwalik Gavialis
                            - - †Siquisiquesuchus venezuelensis
                              - - †Piscogavialis jugaliperforatus
                                - - †Ikanogavialis gameroi
                                  - †Dadagavialis gunai
                                - - †Gryposuchus pachakamue
                                  - - †Gryposuchus neogaeus
                                    - - †Gryposuchus croizati
                                      - †Gryposuchus colombianus
