= Eothoracosaurus =

Eothoracosaurus Temporal range: Late Cretaceous, 72.6–66 Ma

Scientific classification
- Kingdom: Animalia
- Phylum: Chordata
- Class: Reptilia
- Clade: Pseudosuchia
- Clade: Crocodylomorpha
- Clade: Metasuchia
- Clade: Neosuchia
- Clade: Eusuchia
- Genus: †Eothoracosaurus; Brochu 2004

Type species
- Eothoracosaurus mississippiensis Brochu 2004

Extinct genus of reptiles

Eothoracosaurus (meaning "dawn Thoracosaurus") is an extinct monospecific genus of eusuchian crocodylomorphs found in Eastern United States which existed during the Late Cretaceous period. Eothoracosaurus is considered to belong to an informally named clade called the "thoracosaurs", named after the closely related Thoracosaurus. Thoracosaurs in general were traditionally thought to be related to the modern false gharial, largely because the nasal bones contact the premaxillae, but phylogenetic work starting in the 1990s instead supported affinities within gavialoid exclusive of such forms. Even more recent phylogenetic studies suggest that thoracosaurs might instead be non-crocodilian eusuchians.

== Discovery and naming ==
Fossils are known from the Ripley Formation in Mississippi and date back to the early Maastrichtian stage of the Late Cretaceous. Some fragmentary material from the Coon Creek Formation of western Tennessee dating back to the late Campanian (slightly older than the specimens from Mississippi) has been referred to Eothoracosaurus as well. The holotype specimen of Eothoracosaurus (MSU 3293, a skull and associated postcrania in the collection of the university's Dunn-Seiler Museum) was originally discovered in 1931 and first described by Kenneth Carpenter in 1983 and initially referred to Thoracosaurus neocesariensis. The material was eventually reexamined by Christopher Brochu in 2004, taking note of substantial differences to other thoracosaurs and finding them severe enough to warrant a separate genus: Eothoracosaurus.

The name derives from the genus Thoracosaurus (chest lizard) and the prefix "eos" meaning dawn, chosen to reflect the fact that Eothoracosaurus appeared earlier in the fossil record than its relative. The species name mississippiensis represents the state of Mississippi, where the holotype was discovered.

== Description ==
Like in the modern gharial, the skull of Eothoracosaurus is strongly elongated with the head growing notably broader further back. The external nares are entirely surrounded by the premaxilla, which extends between the maxilla as far back as the approximate position of the fourth maxillary tooth on the dorsal surface and up to the third tooth when viewed from below. Each premaxilla contains 5 teeth, with the first four roughly equal in size while the fifth is notably smaller. There is a small lateral notch between the premaxilla and maxilla. The maxillae contain 21 to 22 teeth on each side. The first tooth is smaller than those following it, with the size of the successive teeth remaining roughly uniform until the last 7 teeth, which grow progressively smaller. The preserved teeth show they were slender and conical and fairly evenly spaced. Although the skull overall widens, the width of the maxilla stays approximately the same regardless. The paired nasal bones extend over most of the rostrum, creating a small wedge been the premaxilla. They run parallel to the maxilla up to the eleventh tooth, at which point they expand until roughly their contact with the lacrimal bones. The back of the nasal is contacted by the elongated and slender frontal process of the frontal bone. In Eothoracosaurus, the frontal process is twice as long as the main body, while in Thoracosaurus the ratio is closer to 1:1. In gharials, the process is even shorter. The interfenestral bar of the parietal bone is another key trait that differentiates Eothoracosaurus, being relatively wider (around half the length of one fenestra), while in Thoracosaurus, the width varies between less than a third or a fourth depending on the species. The width of the bar varies in modern gharials based on age, but is also generally smaller relative to the width of the fenestra.

== Phylogeny ==
The relationship between thoracosaurs and modern crocodylians is traditionally uncertain and commonly debated. Early research into the matter linked thoracosaurs to the Tomistominae, the extant false gharial and relatives, which at the time were believed to form a distinct clade within Crocodylidae. In his 2004 redescription, Brochu instead recovered thoracosaurs as a paraphyletic grade at the base of Gavialidae. The study notes that most characters linking thoracosaurs and tomistomines are plesiomorphic in nature and that, even if Tomistoma and Gavialis were more closely related then assumed in the phylogenetic tree, Eothoracosaurus would still clade closer with Gavialis. This possibility would eventually be repeatedly supported by molecular studies that recovered tomistomines as a paraphyletic grade at the base of Gavialoidea.

The below cladogram is an example of thoracosaurs as basal gavialoids as recovered by Rio and Mannion (2021) based on morphological data alone. Although the anatomy matches gavialoid affinities, the authors note that those synapomorphies are generally ambiguous and possibly related to convergent evolution caused by the independent evolution of a longirostrine skull morphology.

- Gavialidae
  - Tomistominae
    - †Paratomistoma courti
    - Tomistoma schlegelii, false gharial
  - - †Toyotamaphimeia machikanensis
    - - †Penghusuchus pani
      - - - †"Tomistoma" cairense
          - - †Thoracosaurus isorhynchus
            - - †Eosuchus minor
              - †Eosuchus lerichei
        - - - †Portugalosuchus azenhae
            - - †Thoracosaurus neocesariensis
              - †Eothoracosaurus mississippiensis
          - - †Tomistoma dowsoni
            - - †Eogavialis africanum
              - - †Aktiogavialis caribesi
                - - †Argochampsa krebsi
                  - - - †Piscogavialis jugaliperforatus
                      - - †Siquisiquesuchus venezuelensis
                        - †Ikanogavialis gameroi
                    - - †Dadagavialis gunai
                      - - - †Gryposuchus pachakamue
                          - †Gryposuchus colombianus
                        - - †Gryposuchus neogaeus
                          - - †Gryposuchus croizati
                            - - †Gavialis lewisi
                              - - †Gavialis browni
                                - Gavialis gangeticus, gharial

Alternatively, recent phylogenetic studies combining morphological, molecular and stratigraphic data argue that rather than being gavialoids, thoracosaurs were basal, non-crocodylian Eusuchians, as shown in the cladogram below:

- - - Allodaposuchus palustris
    - Lohuecosuchus megadontos
  - - - - Borealosuchus sternbergii
        - - Borealosuchus formidabilis
          - - Borealosuchus acutidentatus
            - Borealosuchus wilsoni
      - Thoracosaurs
        - Eothoracosaurus mississippiensis
        - - - Thoracosaurus neocesariensis
            - Thoracosaurus macrorhynchus
          - - Argochampsa krebsi
            - - Eogavialis africanum
              - - Eosuchus minor
                - Eosuchus lerichei
    - - Planocraniidae
      - Crocodylia
        - Alligatoridae
        - - Gavialidae
          - Crocodylidae

== Paleoenvironment ==
Thoracosaurs such as Eothoracosaurus are typically associated with marine environments and coastal habitats and are thought to have lived in and around shallow marine areas. They are likely to have eaten fish and cephalopods. The Coon Creek Formation yielded oceanic fauna such as the sharks Otodus and Squalicorax, the sea turtle Toxochelys, and mosasaurs including Plioplatecarpus and Globidens.
