= Ikanogavialis =

Ikanogavialis Temporal range: Late Miocene 11.6–6.8 Ma Possible Quaternary records
- Skull diagram in several views
- Size comparison

Scientific classification
- Kingdom: Animalia
- Phylum: Chordata
- Class: Reptilia
- Order: Crocodylia
- Family: Gavialidae
- Subfamily: †Gryposuchinae
- Genus: †Ikanogavialis; Sill 1970

Species
- †I. gameroi Sill 1970 (type); †?I. papuensis (De Vis 1905 [originally Gavialis papuensis])

Extinct genus of reptiles

Ikanogavialis is an extinct genus of gavialid crocodilian. Fossils have been found in the Urumaco Formation in Urumaco, Venezuela. The strata from which its fossils are found are late Miocene in age, rather than Pliocene as was once thought. Fossil remains of a similar crocodilian which might belong to the same genus were found from Quaternary beds on Muyua or Woodlark Island in Papua New Guinea.

== Description ==
Ikanogavialis possessed an extremely elongated snout accounting for more than 80% of the skull length, the orbits had prominent anterior borders similar to those of modern Gavialis. The teeth were very numerous (30 on each maxilla, and 31 on each dentary) and they were oriented horizontally, superficially resembling a sawfish.

== Species ==
The type species of Ikanogavialis is I. gameroi. It was named in 1970 from material found from the Urumaco formation of Venezuela, South America.

Additionally, a Pleistocene gavialoid found on Woodlark Island of Papua New Guinea was initially named Gavialis papuensis in 1905, but has since been proposed to be a member of Ikanogavialis, although the poor quality of the preserved material makes it difficult to determine.

== Paleobiology ==
Ikanogavialis may have lived in a coastal paleoenvironment along with other gavialids such as Gryposuchus. The strata of the Urumaco formation were deposited in both marine and fluvial settings, although it is unclear to which portion both genera belong. Other gavialoids such as Siquisiquesuchus and Piscogavialis are known to have lived in coastal environments, and it is likely that extant freshwater gavialoids such as Gavialis may have originated from these coastal forms. Ikanogavialis also existed with many other crocodilians in Venezuela during the late Miocene including the giant caiman Purussaurus and an extinct species of Melanosuchus.

"Gavialis" / Ikanogavialis papuensis was similarly fully marine, having been found in association with sea turtles and sirenians. It represents the youngest fully marine crocodilian to date.

== Phylogeny ==
A phylogenetic analysis conducted in a 2007 study found Gryposuchinae to include the genera Aktiogavialis, Gryposuchus, Ikanogavialis, Piscogavialis, and Siquisiquesuchus. Below is a cladogram from the 2007 analysis showing the phylogenetic relationships of gryposuchines among gavialoids:

- Gavialoidea
  - Eothoracosaurus
  - - Thoracosaurus
    - - Eosuchus
      - Argochampsa
      - Gavialidae
        - Eogavialis
        - - Gavialis
          - Gryposuchinae
            - Ikanogavialis
            - Piscogavialis
            - Siquisiquesuchus
            - Gryposuchus
            - Aktiogavialis

Alternatively, a 2018 tip dating study by Lee & Yates simultaneously using morphological, molecular (DNA sequencing), and stratigraphic (fossil age) data indicated that the members of Gryposuchinae may in fact be paraphyletic and rather an evolutionary grade towards Gavialis and the gharial, as shown in the cladogram below:

- Gavialidae
  - - - - - - - - Gavialis gangeticus Gharial
                - Gavialis bengawanicus†
              - Gavialis browni†
            - Gryposuchus colombianus†
          - Ikanogavialis†
        - - Gryposuchus pachakamue†
          - Piscogavialis†
      - Harpacochampsa†
    - - - Toyotamaphimeia†
        - Penghusuchus†
      - Gavialosuchus†
  - - Tomistoma lusitanicum†
    - Tomistoma schlegelii False gharial
