= Hesperogavialis =

Hesperogavialis Temporal range: Mid-Late Miocene (Mayoan-Huayquerian) ~11.6–7.246 Ma

Scientific classification
- Domain: Eukaryota
- Kingdom: Animalia
- Phylum: Chordata
- Class: Reptilia
- Clade: Archosauromorpha
- Clade: Archosauriformes
- Order: Crocodilia
- Family: Gavialidae
- Subfamily: †Gryposuchinae
- Genus: †Hesperogavialis; Bocquetin and Buffetaut, 1981

Species
- H. cruxenti Bocquetin and Buffetaut, 1981 (type); H. bocquentini ?

Extinct genus of reptiles

Hesperogavialis is an extinct genus of gryposuchine gavialid. Fossils have been found from Venezuela and Brazil that date back to the Middle to Late Miocene. Although Hesperogavialis is one of the best known gavialoids from South America, the posterior portion of the skull is still unknown, making any attempts at classification within the family somewhat more difficult than other gavialoids in which much of the skull is present. The genus possibly comprises three species. The type species, H. cruxenti, has been found in the Urumaco Formation in Venezuela. A second possible species, named H. bocquentini, has been described from the Solimões Formation in Acre, Brazil, and can be distinguished from H. cruxenti by the asymmetry seen in the anterior portion of the nasals and the small distance between alveoli. A third species can be recognized from the same locality in Acre, although a formal name has yet to be given to it.

== Phylogenetics ==
Although considered a South American gryposuchine, Hesperogavialis may actually have had closer relations to the extant Gavialis known from Asia. This has been concluded on the basis of a lack of a nasal-premaxillary contact on the rostrum that can be seen in the extinct South American gavialoids. The position of these bones bears a closer resemblance to Gavialis by being rather slender and extending from the orbits to the middle of the rostrum while being considerably separated from the premaxilla. This close relationship suggests that there may have been multiple gavialid dispersal events from the Old World to South America. It has also been proposed that this is just an independently derived characteristic unique to Hesperogavialis among the gryposuchines, and that it does not suggest any relationship to Asian gavialoids.
