= Siquisiquesuchus =

Siquisiquesuchus Temporal range: Early Miocene, 20.4–16 Ma

Scientific classification
- Kingdom: Animalia
- Phylum: Chordata
- Class: Reptilia
- Clade: Archosauria
- Order: Crocodilia
- Superfamily: Gavialoidea
- Family: Gavialidae
- Subfamily: †Gryposuchinae
- Genus: †Siquisiquesuchus; Brochu & Rincón 2004

Type species
- †Siquisiquesuchus venezuelensis Brochu & Rincón 2004

Extinct genus of reptiles

Siquisiquesuchus (meaning "Siquisique crocodile" after the town in Lara, Venezuela, near where the first described specimens were found) is an extinct genus of gavialid crocodilian. It is known from cranial remains and a few postcranial bones found in Miocene-age rocks of the Castillo Formation in northwestern Venezuela.

== Description ==
Siquisiquesuchus is based on the holotype MBLUZ–P–5050, a nearly complete skull and lower jaws. It was found near Lara in rocks of the Early Miocene-age Castillo Formation. Two other partial skulls, partial vertebrae, a thigh bone, partial upper arm, and partial shin bone were recovered from another locality. These bones were described by Christopher Brochu and Ascanio Rincón in 2004. The type species is S. venezuelensis.

Like other gavialoids, Siquisiquesuchus had a long, narrow rostrum on its skull, accounting for approximately 60% of the skull's length. The number of teeth in the premaxillary bones at the tip of the snout is not known, but the maxillae making up most of the rostrum had at least 20 teeth each, and the dentaries of the lower jaws had at least 23. Some details of the described skulls cannot be determined because the sutures are not visible.

Siquisiquesuchus was found by Brochu and Rincón to be the oldest known gavialoid from South America, sharing various anatomical details with Gryposuchus colombianus (to which it is particularly similar) and other South American gavialoids. Later studies have concurred with a gavialoid identity, finding the genus to be related to such genera as Gavialis, Gryposuchus, Ikanogavialis, and Piscogavialis. Vélez–Juarbe and colleagues (2007) found it to be a gryposuchinae gavialid, while Jouve and colleagues (2008) did not assign families or subfamilies. Brochu and Rincón noted that Siquisiquesuchus was found in marginal marine deposits. This, along with similarities to Old World gavialoids, was interpreted as evidence that gavialoids "dispersed across a marine barrier to the Neotropics during the Tertiary."
