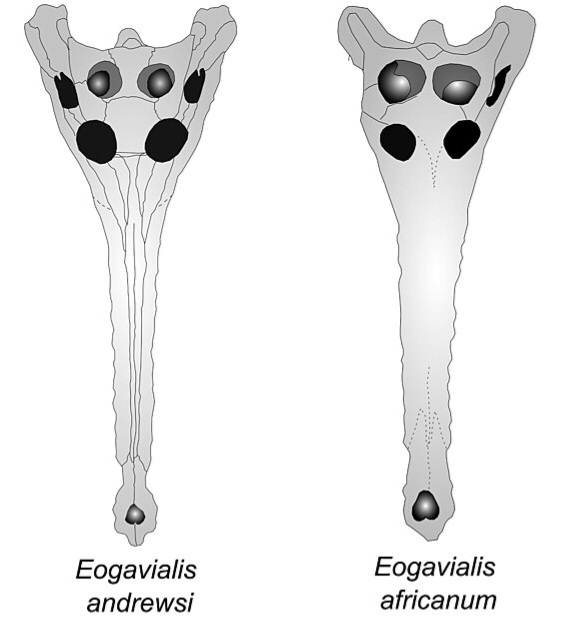
- Skulls from both species of Eogavialis

Scientific classification
- Kingdom: Animalia
- Phylum: Chordata
- Class: Reptilia
- Clade: Archosauria
- Clade: Pseudosuchia
- Clade: Crocodylomorpha
- Clade: Metasuchia
- Clade: Neosuchia
- Clade: Eusuchia
- Genus: †Eogavialis; Buffetaut 1982

Species
- †E. africanum (Andrews 1901 [originally Tomistoma africanum]) (type); †E. andrewsi (Storrs 2003)

Synonyms
- †Tomistoma gavialoides (Andrews 1905); †Tomistoma kerunense (Andrews 1905); †Tomistoma tenuirostre (Muller 1927)

= Eogavialis =

Eogavialis Temporal range: Late Eocene – Pliocene, 37.2–2.59 Ma

Extinct genus of reptiles

Eogavialis is an extinct genus of eusuchian crocodylomorph, usually regarded as a gavialoid crocodylian. It superficially resembles Tomistoma schlegelii, the extant false gharial, and consequently material from the genus was originally referred to Tomistoma. Indeed, it was not until 1982 that the name Eogavialis was constructed after it was realised that the specimens were from a more basal form.

== Species ==
The genus was first described by Charles William Andrews in 1901 when Andrews named a new species of Tomistoma, T. africanum, on the basis of a specimen found from an outcrop of the Qasr el-Sagha Formation in Egypt, about 20 miles northwest of Faiyum, dating back to the Priabonian stage of the late Eocene 37.2 to 33.9 million years ago. Other specimens were later found from the Gebel Qatrani Formation, slightly younger than the Qasr el-Sagha dating back to the Rupelian stage of the early Oligocene 33.9 to 28.4 million years ago, and near the locality where the original specimen of T. africanum was found in the Faiyum depression. A new species was also found from this locality and named T. gavialoides by Andrews in 1905.

One of the first papers to identify the differences between these two species and others within Tomistoma was published in 1955 by J. A. Kälin. Other papers were written in the following decades that also questioned these species' relationships within Tomistominae. Eric Buffetaut proposed the genus name Eogavialis in 1982 and reassigned both T. africanum and T. gavialoides to it. In 2000, Brochu and Gingerich argued that T. gavialoides, T. kerunense and T. tenuirostre are all junior synonyms of Eogavialis africanum, since they're morphologically indistinguishable with the only difference in stratigraphic position.

A third species was assigned to Eogavialis in 2003 from material found in the 1990s from the lower Nawata Formation of the Turkana basin outcropping in Lothagam, Kenya. The strata from which the material was found dates back to the late Miocene and early Pliocene, around 11.61 to 2.59 million years ago. This extends the fossil range of the genus by approximately 17 million years. It was named E. andrewsi for Charles Williams Andrews. The holotype consists of a well preserved, nearly complete skull.

One reason why Eogavialis was initially placed within Tomistoma was due to the fact that the premaxilla and nasal bones made contact with one another, a feature also seen in Tomistoma. However, this characteristic has since been shown to be present in other extinct gavialids, meaning that premaxilla and nasal contact is a plesiomorphic trait of all tomistomines, including basal ones. Eogavialis also has a very similar cranial anatomy when compared to Tomistoma, having the same proportions, rostral length, and tooth number, leading to the conclusion by some authors of papers published after 1982 that Eogavialis is synonymous with Tomistoma.

== Phylogeny ==
Tomistomines have been traditionally classified as crocodiles. However, molecular analyses of the false gharial, the only living tomistomine, suggest that the subfamily is actually within Gavialidae (along with the modern gharial of the subfamily Gavialinae) rather than Crocodylinae. The presence of a prominent crista that runs along the postorbital in Eogavialis testifies to its position as a gavialid. Other characteristics such as a rectangular skull table, subcircular orbits with everted orbital rims, and a constricted antorbital area are also shared with Eogavialis and other modern gavialids, as seen in a well preserved skull of E. africanum housed at Yale (YPM 6263) and material from Kenya of E. andrewsi.

Eogavialis has often been proposed to be non-tomistomine due to its lack of supposedly crocodylid synapomorphies needed in order for a taxon to be placed within Tomistominae. The genus lacks the exposure of the vomer on the palate that has been viewed as a characteristic of tomistomines. The trend for a long, narrow rostrum developing progressively over time as seen in Eogavialis has been used to suggest that the genus was a direct ancestor of Gavialis. Gryposuchus was once seen as phylogenetically between Eogavialis and Gavialis.

Eogavialis africanum was included in the study on the phylogenetic relationships of putative fossil gavialoids published by Lee & Yates (2018). The authors considered it most likely that E. africanum was not a gavialoid, or even a crocodylian, but rather a member of the clade of non-crocodylian eusuchians that also included the genera Argochampsa, Eosuchus, Eothoracosaurus and Thoracosaurus.

== Paleoecology ==
E. andrewsi was found in fluvial deposits within the Lower Nawata member of the Nawata Formation in Kenya. A broad, shallow, meandering river is thought to have existed at the time of deposition, suitable for an aquatic gavialid such as Eogavialis. Evidence for a semideciduous tree savanna that may have surrounded the river is present in the lower beds, and a general trend in increased aridity can be seen in overlying beds in the member, suggesting a dry thornbush savanna environment. Fossils present from the strata that material from E. andrewsi were found include those of numerous teleost fish such as osteoglossiformes and perciformes, many turtles, crocodiles, and birds such as ostriches, the enigmatic large bird Eremopezus, anatids, rails, and owls, as well as many mammals representing both living and extinct taxa common in Africa.

The area of the Gebel Qatrani Formation in the Faiyum Depression where most of the well-preserved specimens of E. africanum and E. gavialoides were found was also deposited in a fluvial paleoenvironment, although much older. Other fossils found from the formation include those of turtles, crocodiles, hyaenodontids, proboscideans such as Phiomia, Palaeomastodon, and Moeritherium, the Embrithopodan Arsinoitherium, numerous species of hyraxes, artiodactyls, as well as some of the earliest simian primates such as Apidium, Catopithecus, Oligopithecus, and Aegyptopithecus. Discoveries from this formation have added greatly to the understanding of mammalian evolution in Africa. The presence of this type of fauna suggests a humid, tropical climate existed in Egypt during the Oligocene.

Much of the Gebel Qatrani consists of other deposits that represent both marine and non-marine sedimentary depositional environments. Some specimens of Eogavialis are known from these strata as well, suggesting that the genus may also have been adapted to a coastal marine habitat. This differs from the mostly freshwater habitats inhabited by extant crocodilians.
