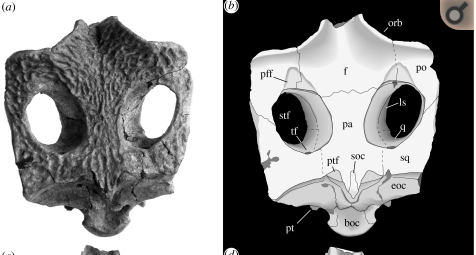
- An image (A) and a drawing (B) of the underside of the skull of Aktiogavialis puertoricensis

Scientific classification
- Kingdom: Animalia
- Phylum: Chordata
- Class: Reptilia
- Clade: Archosauria
- Order: Crocodilia
- Family: Gavialidae
- Subfamily: †Gryposuchinae
- Genus: †Aktiogavialis; Vélez-Juarbe et al., 2007

Species
- †A. puertoricensis Vélez-Juarbe, Brochu & Santos 2007 (type); †A. caribesi Salas-Gismondi et al., 2018

= Aktiogavialis =

Aktiogavialis Temporal range: Oligocene-Miocene, 28–6.8 Ma

Species of reptile (fossil)

Aktiogavialis is an extinct genus of crocodylian that lived from the Oligocene until the Miocene in what is now the Caribbean. Two species have been described: Aktiogavialis puertoricensis from the Middle Oligocene of Puerto Rico and Aktiogavialis caribesi from the Huayquerian of the Late Miocene of Venezuela.

As a typical gavialoid, Aktiogavialis followed the standard crocodilian body plan. An elongated, squat quadrupedal body terminated in a long, laterally flattened tail at one end, and a specialized, narrow snout at the other. As with the other members of its family, the snout of Aktiogavialis was extremely long and narrow, tapering into a thin structure past the eye sockets. Based on the fragmentary remains recovered, the species was differentiated from other members of its family by unique positioning and geometry of its skull elements. Phylogenetic analysis indicates its closest relatives were the extinct gavials Gryposuchus and Siquisiquesuchus.

The type species of the genus, A. puertoricensis, was described in 2007. The holotype, designated UPRMP 3094, was discovered in Puerto Rican deposits dating around 28 million years old, from the Middle to Late Oligocene. The deposits, part of the San Sebastián Formation along the Río Guatemala in Puerto Rico, have been an adequate supply of other crocodylian fossils. Aktiogavialis remains recovered were extremely fragmentary, consisting of an incomplete skull featuring elements of the braincase and other scattered cranial elements.

Marine sediments and nannofossils form part of the deposits where the specimen was found, indicating a marine distribution for A. puertoricensis. This is in contrast with the living gavialoids, which reside entirely in the freshwater rivers of South Asia. While fossils found in prehistoric deltaic sediments possibly have been washed onto the delta from inland sources, the Aktiogavialis specimen found so far was from a location that had essentially been islandic. This has led to conclusions that gavialoids were partially or primarily saltwater reptiles prior to the evolution of the group's one or two extant species.

The genus' name, Aktiogavialis, is derived from the Greek words aktios (river) and gavialis (gavial). This roughly translates to "shore gavial", referring to its rather estuarine distribution. The specific name puertoricensis means "from Puerto Rico", in reference to the specimen's country of origin.

== Bibliography ==
- Vélez-Juarbe, Jorge; Christopher A Brochu; Hernán Santos (2007-03-06). "A gharial from the Oligocene of Puerto Rico: transoceanic dispersal in the history of a non-marine reptile". Proceedings of the Royal Society. 274 (1615). The Royal Society: 1245–54. doi:10.1098/rspb.2006.0455. PMC 2176176. PMID 17341454.
