= Dadagavialis =

Dadagavialis Temporal range: Oligocene-Miocene, 23.03–15.97 Ma

Scientific classification
- Kingdom: Animalia
- Phylum: Chordata
- Class: Reptilia
- Clade: Archosauria
- Order: Crocodilia
- Family: Gavialidae
- Subfamily: †Gryposuchinae
- Genus: †Dadagavialis; Salas-Gismondi et al., 2018

Species
- †Dadagavialis gunai Salas-Gismondi et al., 2018 (type)

Species of reptile (fossil)

Dadagavialis is an extinct monospecific genus of gavialid crocodylian that lived during the Early Miocene in what is now Panama. It was described in 2018, and was proposed to be a member of Gryposuchinae. However, other studies have shown Gryposuchinae to be paraphyletic and rather an evolutionary grade towards the living gharial, and thus Dadagavialis might just be classified as a member of Gavialidae.
