= Argochampsa =

Argochampsa Temporal range: Paleocene, 66–56 Ma
- Skull diagram of different specimens
- Size comparison of A.krebsi

Scientific classification
- Kingdom: Animalia
- Phylum: Chordata
- Class: Reptilia
- Clade: Pseudosuchia
- Clade: Crocodylomorpha
- Clade: Eusuchia
- Genus: †Argochampsa; Hua & Jouve 2004

Type species
- Argochampsa krebsi Hua & Jouve 2004

Extinct genus of reptiles

Argochampsa (meaning "Argo crocodile", in reference to the mythological Argo of Jason) is an extinct genus of eusuchian crocodylomorph, usually regarded as a gavialoid crocodilian, related to modern gharials. It lived in the Paleocene of Morocco. Described by Hua and Jouve in 2004, the type species is A. krebsi, with the species named for Bernard Krebs. Argochampsa had a long narrow snout, and appears to have been marine in habits.

== Description ==
Argochampsa is based on OCP DEK-GE 1201, a nearly complete skull from the Oulad Abdoun Basin, in the vicinity of Khouribga, Morocco. The skull, 43.3 centimeters long (17.0 in), had a long, narrow snout, marking it as a longirostrine crocodilian; the snout made up about 70% of the skull's length. The premaxillae at the tip of the snout were downturned, and the tip somewhat squared off, with the first few tooth positions in a straight line perpendicular to the long axis of the skull. There were five teeth in each premaxilla and 26 in each maxilla (the main tooth-bearing bone of the upper jaw). The nasal bones were fused, and there were several short diastemas or gaps in the tooth row at the tip of the snout. More recently, material from the lower jaw, neck and back vertebrae, the upper arm, and armor has been recovered. Argochampsa had concave depressions on the internal surface of the lacrimal and prefrontal bones, indicating the presence of salt glands.

Hua and Jouve performed a cladistic analysis incorporating their new taxon, and found Argochampsa to be a gavialoid, but outside of the clade Gavialidae. They noted that the snout shape of Argochampsa is unusual among crocodilians, with only pholidosaurids and Terminonaris having similarly shaped snout tips, and suggested that this layout may have facilitated precise occlusion. Argochampsa lived in an environment otherwise dominated by dyrosaurid marine crocodyliforms.

Argochampsa krebsi was included in the study on the phylogenetic relationships of putative fossil gavialoids published by Lee & Yates (2018). The authors considered it most likely that Argochampsa was not a gavialoid, or even a crocodylian, but rather a member of the clade of non-crocodylian eusuchians that also included the genera Eogavialis, Eosuchus, Eothoracosaurus and Thoracosaurus.

=== "Argochampsa microrhynchus" ===
A second species of the genus from the Paleocene beds of the Oulad Abdoun basin was informally named on a 2018 thesis by Hannah Russell. Proportionally, it shows a much shorter and relatively wider snout than the type species, with a lower number of maxillary teeth and more laterally-protuding alveoli providing the skull with a scalloped outline.
