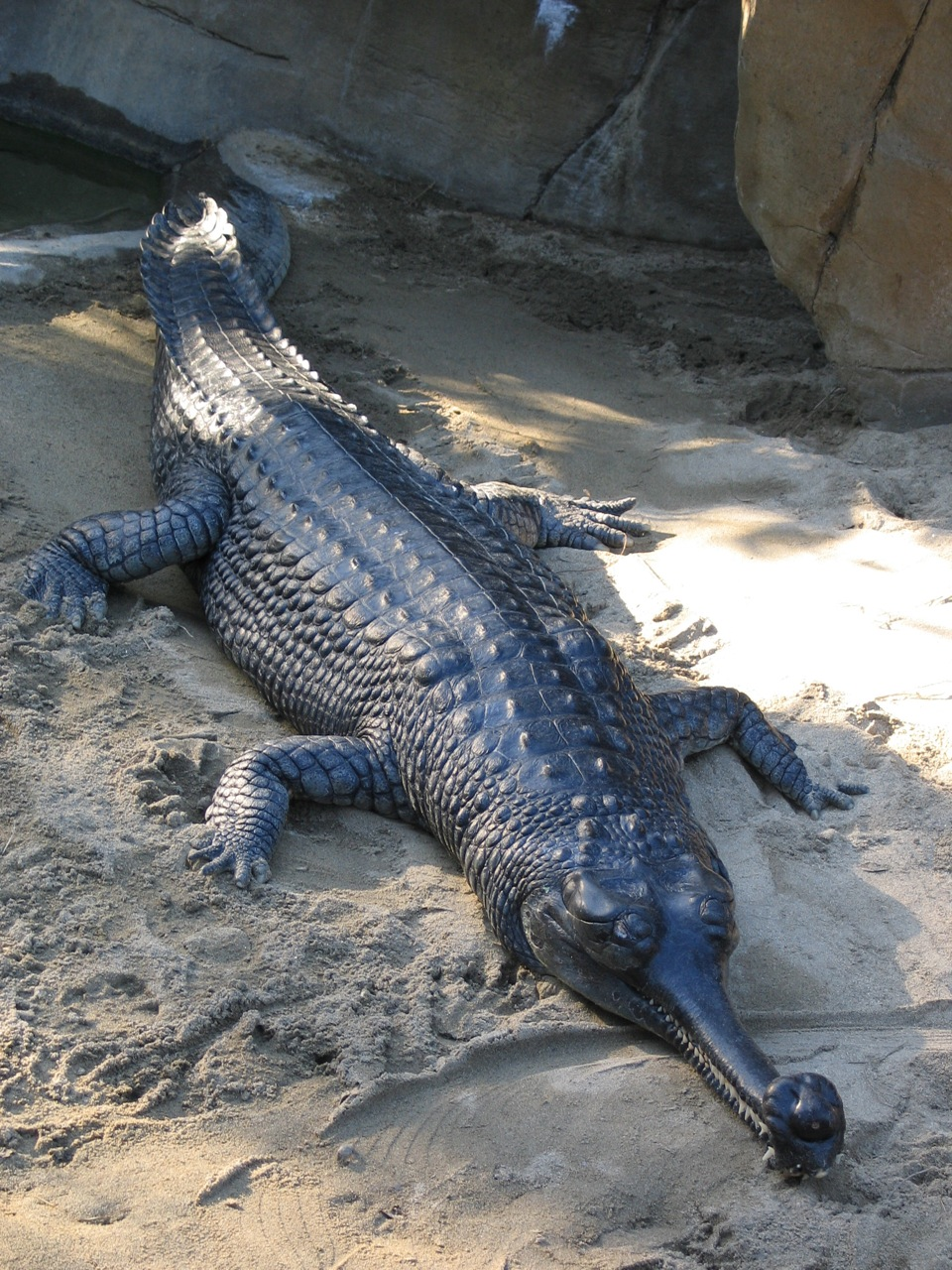
- The gharial (Gavialis gangeticus), the only living species of Gavialis

Scientific classification
- Kingdom: Animalia
- Phylum: Chordata
- Class: Reptilia
- Clade: Archosauria
- Order: Crocodilia
- Family: Gavialidae
- Subfamily: Gavialinae
- Genus: Gavialis; Oppel, 1811

Species
- Gavialis gangeticus; †Gavialis bengawanicus; †Gavialis browni?; †Gavialis lewisi?; †Gavialis leptodus?; †Gavialis hysudricus?; †Gavialis papuensis?

= Gavialis =

Gavialis Temporal range: Early Miocene - recent, 20–0 Ma

Genus of reptiles

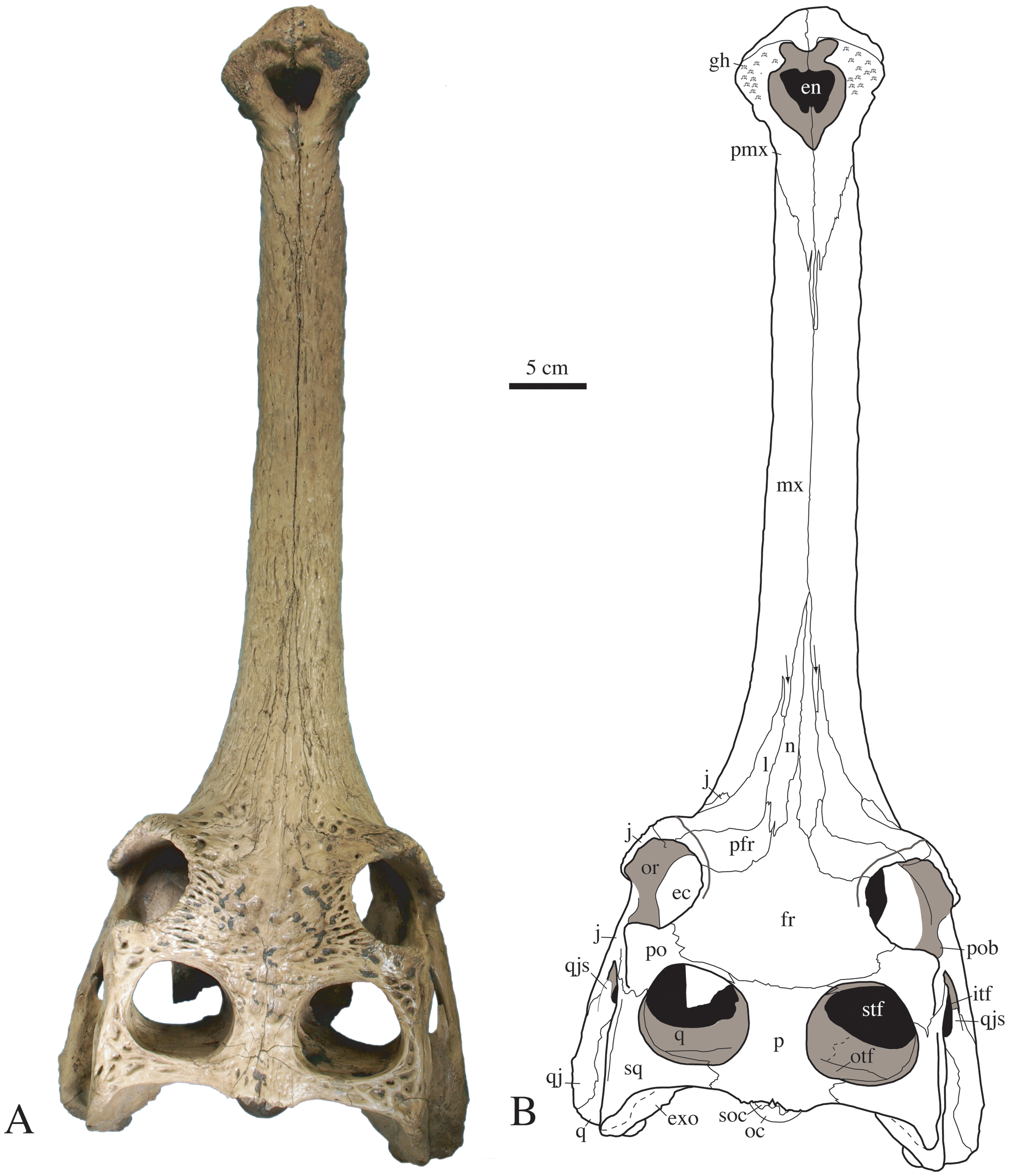
A skull of the extinct Gavialis species G. bengawanicus, which lived in the Pleistocene

Gavialis is a genus of crocodilians that includes the living gharial Gavialis gangeticus and one known extinct species, Gavialis bengawanicus. G. gangeticus comes from the Indian subcontinent, while G. bengawanicus is known from Java. Gavialis likely first appeared in the Indian Subcontinent in the Pliocene and dispersed into the Malay Archipelago through a path called the Siva–Malayan route in the Quaternary. Remains attributed to Gavialis have also been found on Sulawesi and Woodlark Island east of the Wallace Line, suggesting a prehistoric lineage of Gavialis was able to traverse marine environments and reach places possibly as far as western Oceania.

The genus Gavialis was reevaluated in 2018 based on specimens in the Natural History Museum, London that were collected in the Sivalik Hills. The author concluded that G. gangeticus and G. bengawanicus are the only two species in the genus Gavialis, with G. hysudricus as a junior synonym of G. gangeticus. Rhamphosuchus is proposed to include G. leptodus, G. pachyrhynchus, G. curvirostris and G. breviceps. The species G. browni and G. lewisi require further revisions. G. dixoni has been assigned its own genus, Dollosuchus. In 2025, G. pachyrhynchus and its junior synonym G. breviceps were included within the genus Rhamphosuchus as a new combination R. pachyrhynchus, while G. curvirostris was assigned to its own genus, Pseudogavialis.

The below cladogram of the major extant crocodile groups is based on the latest molecular studies, and shows the gharial's close relationship to the false gharial, and how the gavialids and crocodiles are more closely related than the alligatoroids:

- Crocodilia
  - Alligatoridae
    - Caimaninae
      - - Caiman
        - Melanosuchus
      - Paleosuchus
    - Alligatorinae
      Alligator
  - Longirostres
    - Crocodylidae
      - Crocodylus
      - - Mecistops
        - Osteolaemus
    - Gavialidae
      - Gavialis
      - Tomistoma

Here is a more detailed cladogram that shows Gavialis's proposed placement within Gavialidae, including extinct members:

- Gavialidae
  - - - - - - - - Gavialis gangeticus Gharial
                - Gavialis bengawanicus†
              - Gavialis browni†
            - Gryposuchus colombianus†
          - Ikanogavialis†
        - - Gryposuchus pachakamue†
          - Piscogavialis†
      - Harpacochampsa†
    - - - Toyotamaphimeia†
        - Penghusuchus†
      - Gavialosuchus†
  - - Tomistoma lusitanicum†
    - Tomistoma schlegelii False gharial
