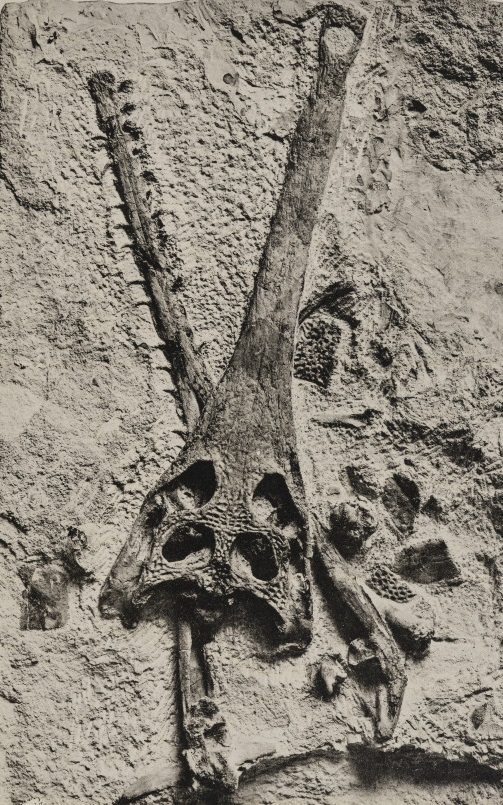
- Thoracosaurus macrorhynchus skull and jaws from the Paleocene (Danian) of Sweden

Scientific classification
- Kingdom: Animalia
- Phylum: Chordata
- Class: Reptilia
- Clade: Archosauria
- Clade: Pseudosuchia
- Clade: Crocodylomorpha
- Clade: Eusuchia
- Genus: †Thoracosaurus; Leidy, 1852

Species
- †Thoracosaurus neocesariensis (de Kay, 1842 [originally Gavialis neocesariensis]) (type); †Thoracosaurus isorhynchus (Pomel, 1847); †Thoracosaurus macrorhynchus (de Blainville, 1855)

= Thoracosaurus =

Thoracosaurus Temporal range: Late Cretaceous - Early Paleocene, 70.6–61.6 Ma

Extinct genus of reptiles

Thoracosaurus (chest lizard) is an extinct genus of long-snouted eusuchian which existed during the Late Cretaceous and Early Paleocene in North America and Europe.

== Taxonomy ==
Thoracosaurus had traditionally been thought to be related to the modern false gharial, largely because the nasal bones contact the premaxillae. Phylogenetic work starting in the 1990s instead supported affinities within Gavialoidea exclusive of such forms, although a 2018 tip dating study simultaneously using morphological, molecular (DNA sequencing), and stratigraphic (fossil age) data suggests that it might have been a non-crocodylian eusuchian.

The genus contains the type species Thoracosaurus neocesariensis in North America, and what is either Thoracosaurus isorhynchus or Thoracosaurus macrorhynchus from Europe; a recent review argues that T. macrorhynchus is a junior synonym of T. isorhynchus, but it is unclear whether the type of T. isorhynchus allows differentiation of European and North American Thoracosaurus; if not, then T. isorhynchus would be a nomen dubium. A number of species have been referred to this genus, but most are dubious.

== Ecology ==
It is thought to have inhabited marine environments.

== Gallery ==
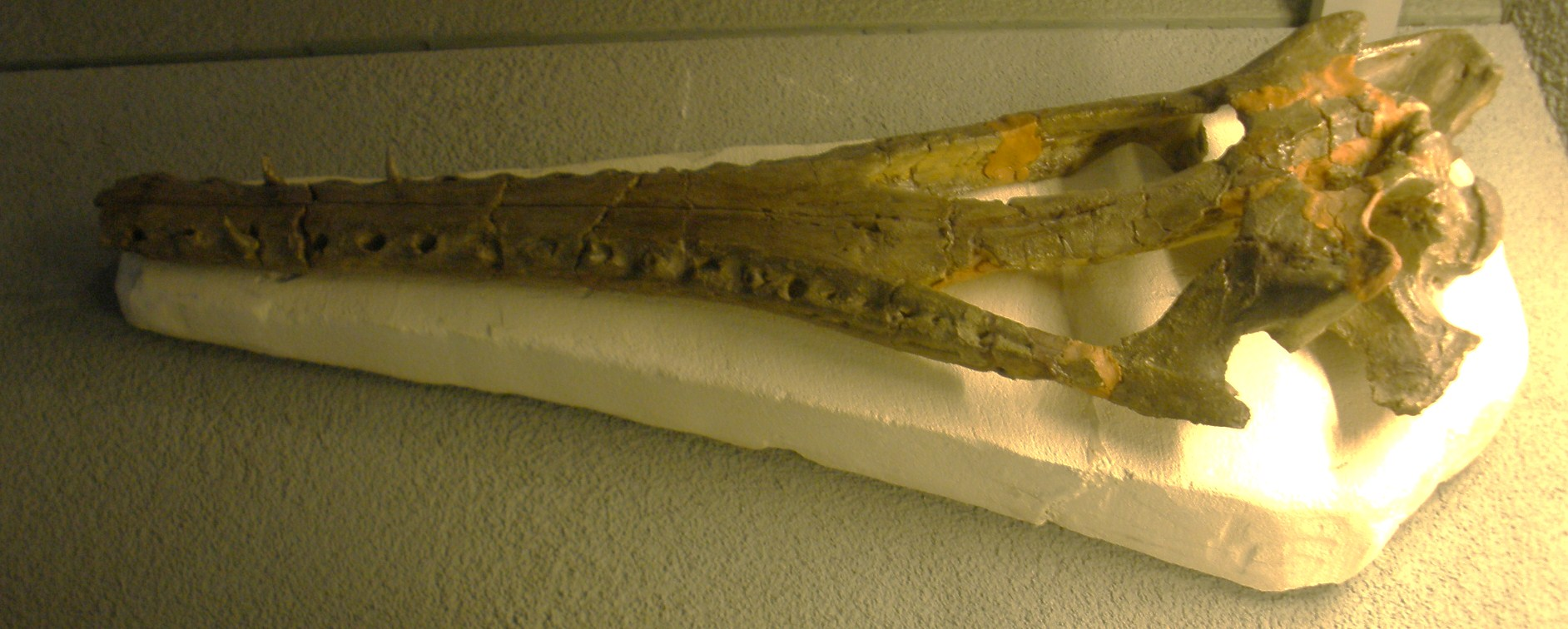
Thoracosaurus macrorhynchus skull at the Naturalis Museum in Leiden, Netherlands

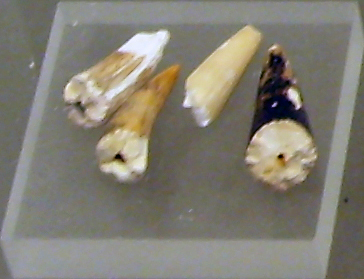
Thoracosaurus sp. teeth at the Geological Museum, Copenhagen

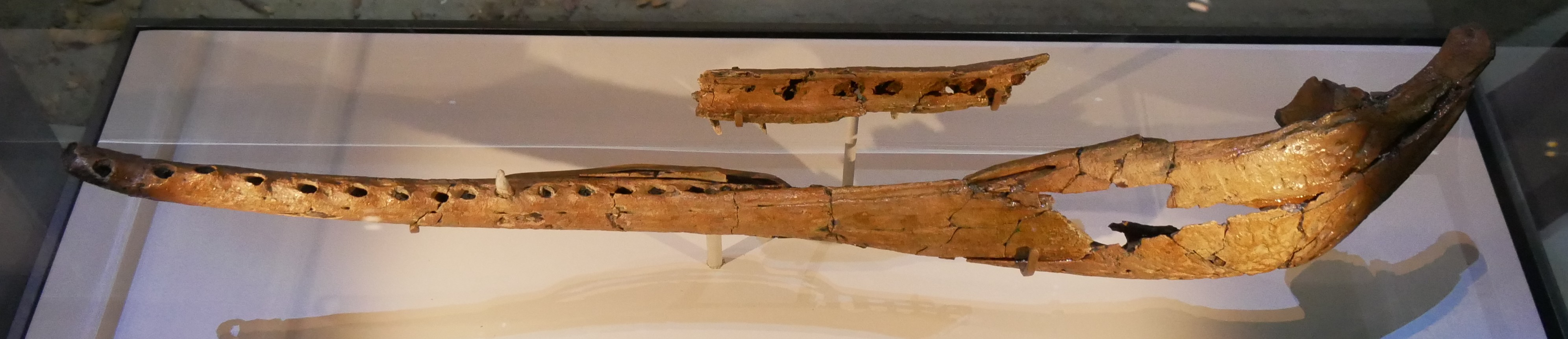
Thoracosaurus neocesariensis mandible at the Edelman Fossil Museum
