= Maroccosuchus =

Maroccosuchus Temporal range: Early Eocene, 55.8–48.6 Ma

Scientific classification
- Kingdom: Animalia
- Phylum: Chordata
- Class: Reptilia
- Clade: Archosauria
- Order: Crocodilia
- Superfamily: Gavialoidea
- Genus: †Maroccosuchus; Jonet & Wouters, 1977

Type species
- †Maroccosuchus zennaroi Jonet & Wouters, 1977

Extinct genus of reptiles

Maroccosuchus zennaroi is an extinct gavialoid crocodylian from the Early Eocene of Morocco, traditionally regarded as a member of the subfamily Tomistominae.

Below is a cladogram based on morphological studies comparing skeletal features that shows Maroccosuchus as a member of Tomistominae, related to the false gharial:

- Crocodylidae
  - Crocodylinae
  - Tomistominae
    - Xaymacachampsa†
    - Megadontosuchus†
    - Kentisuchus†
    - Maroccosuchus†
    - - Dollosuchoides†
      - - - Thecachampsa†
          - - Penghusuchus†
            - Toyotamaphimeia†
        - - Tomistoma cairense†
          - - Maomingosuchus†
            - Tomistoma schlegelii False gharial
            - - Gavialosuchus†
              - Tomistoma lusitanicum†
            - - Paratomistoma†
              - Tomistoma coppensi†

Based on morphological studies of extinct taxa, the tomistomines were long thought to be classified as crocodiles and not closely related to gavialoids. However, recent molecular studies using DNA sequencing have consistently indicated that the false gharial (Tomistoma) (and by inference other related extinct forms in Tomistominae) actually belong to Gavialoidea (and Gavialidae).

Below is a cladogram from a 2018 tip dating study by Lee & Yates simultaneously using morphological, molecular (DNA sequencing), and stratigraphic (fossil age) data that shows Maroccosuchus as an early-diverging gavialoid, more basal than the last common ancestor to both the gharial and the false gharial:

- Gavialoidea (total group)
  - - - - Gavialidae (crown group)
          - - - - - - - - Gavialis gangeticus Gharial
                        - Gavialis bengawanicus†
                      - Gavialis browni†
                    - Gryposuchus colombianus†
                  - Ikanogavialis†
                - - Gryposuchus pachakamue†
                  - Piscogavialis†
              - Harpacochampsa†
            - - - Toyotamaphimeia†
                - Penghusuchus†
              - Gavialosuchus†
          - - Tomistoma lusitanicum†
            - Tomistoma schlegelii False gharial
        - Tomistoma cairense†
      - Dollosuchoides†
    - - Maroccosuchus†
      - Paratomistoma†
  - Kentisuchus†
