= Paratomistoma =

Paratomistoma Temporal range: Middle Eocene, 41.3–38 Ma

Scientific classification
- Kingdom: Animalia
- Phylum: Chordata
- Class: Reptilia
- Clade: Archosauria
- Order: Crocodilia
- Superfamily: Gavialoidea
- Genus: †Paratomistoma; Brochu & Gingerich, 2000

Type species
- †Paratomistoma courti Brochu & Gingerich, 2000

Extinct genus of reptiles

Paratomistoma (meaning "next to or near Tomistoma") is an extinct monospecific genus of gavialoid crocodylian. It is based on the holotype specimen CGM 42188, a partial posterior skull and lower jaw discovered at Wadi Hitan, Egypt, in Middle Eocene-age rocks of the Gehannam Formation. The skull is unfused but considered morphologically mature. Paratomistoma was named in 2000 by Christopher Brochu and Philip Gingerich; the type species is P. courti in honor of Nicholas Court, who found CGM 42188. They performed a phylogenetic analysis and found Paratomistoma to be a derived member of Tomistominae, related to the false gharial. It may have been a marine or coastal crocodilian.

Below is a cladogram based morphological studies comparing skeletal features that shows Paratomistoma as a member of Tomistominae:

- Crocodylidae
  - Crocodylinae
  - Tomistominae
    - Xaymacachampsa†
    - Megadontosuchus†
    - Kentisuchus†
    - Maroccosuchus†
    - - Dollosuchoides†
      - - - Thecachampsa†
          - - Penghusuchus†
            - Toyotamaphimeia†
        - - Tomistoma cairense†
          - - Maomingosuchus†
            - Tomistoma schlegelii False gharial
            - - Gavialosuchus†
              - Tomistoma lusitanicum†
            - - Paratomistoma†
              - Tomistoma coppensi†

Based on morphological studies of extinct taxa, the tomistomines were long thought to be classified as crocodiles and not closely related to gavialoids. However, recent molecular studies using DNA sequencing have consistently indicated that the false gharial (Tomistoma) (and by inference other related extinct forms in Tomistominae) actually belong to Gavialoidea (and Gavialidae).

Below is a cladogram from a 2018 tip dating study by Lee & Yates simultaneously using morphological, molecular (DNA sequencing), and stratigraphic (fossil age) data that shows Paratomistoma as an early-diverging gavialoid, more basal than the last common ancestor to both the gharial and the false gharial:

- Gavialoidea (total group)
  - - - - Gavialidae (crown group)
          - - - - - - - - Gavialis gangeticus Gharial
                        - Gavialis bengawanicus†
                      - Gavialis browni†
                    - Gryposuchus colombianus†
                  - Ikanogavialis†
                - - Gryposuchus pachakamue†
                  - Piscogavialis†
              - Harpacochampsa†
            - - - Toyotamaphimeia†
                - Penghusuchus†
              - Gavialosuchus†
          - - Tomistoma lusitanicum†
            - Tomistoma schlegelii False gharial
        - Tomistoma cairense†
      - Dollosuchoides†
    - - Maroccosuchus†
      - Paratomistoma†
  - Kentisuchus†
