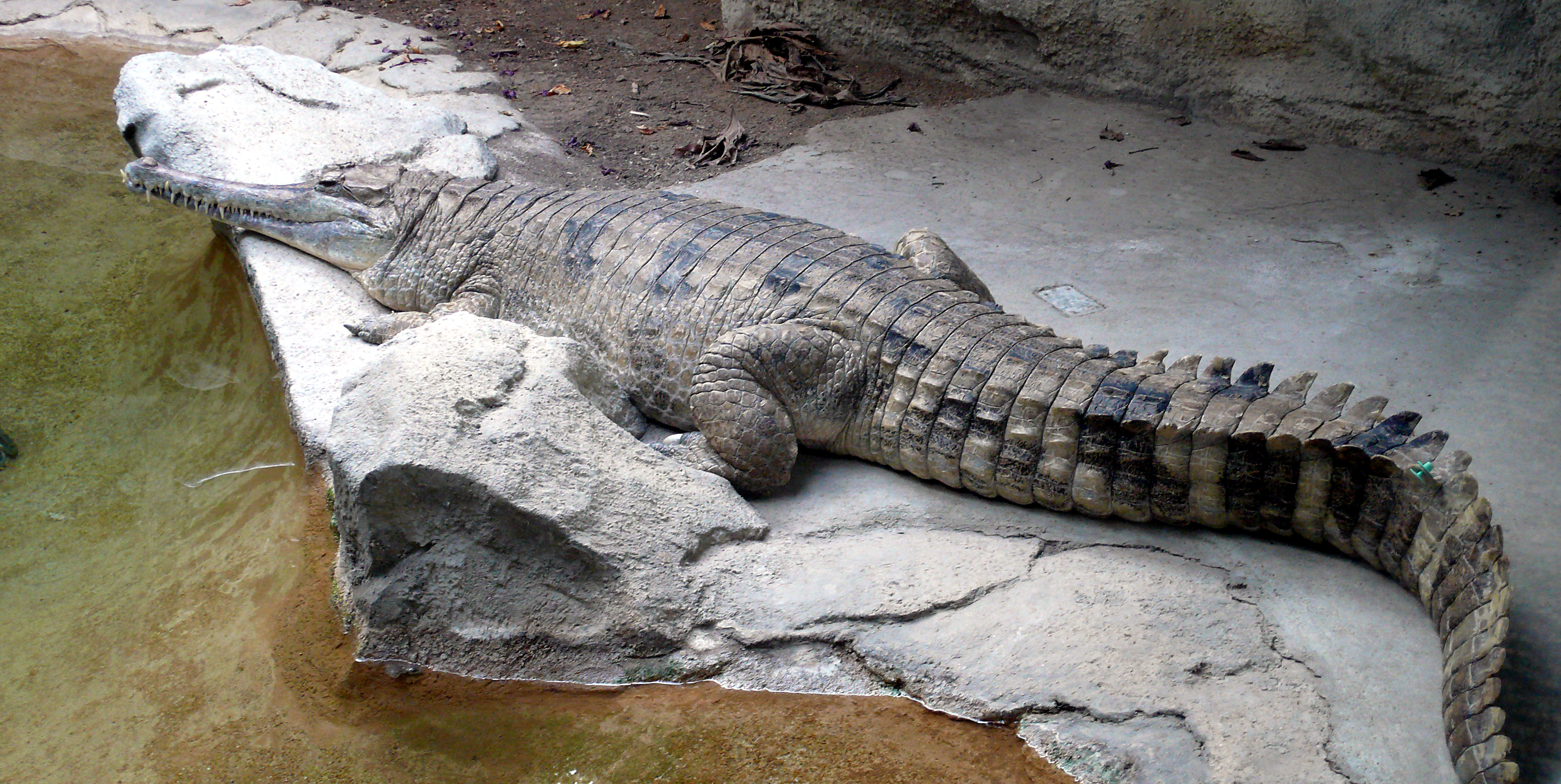
- False gharial, Tomistoma schlegelii

Scientific classification (disputed)
- Kingdom: Animalia
- Phylum: Chordata
- Class: Reptilia
- Order: Crocodylia
- Clade: Longirostres
- Superfamily: Gavialoidea
- Family: Gavialidae
- Subfamily: Tomistominae; Kälin, 1955

Genera
- Tomistoma; †Dollosuchoides?; †Dollosuchus?; †Ferganosuchus?; †Gavialosuchus?; †Gunggamarandu; †Kentisuchus?; †Maomingosuchus?; †Maroccosuchus?; †Megadontosuchus?; †Paratomistoma?; †Penghusuchus?; †Toyotamaphimeia?; †Thecachampsa?

= Tomistominae =

Tomistominae Temporal range: Eocene - Recent, 55–0 Ma

Subfamily of reptiles

Tomistominae is a subfamily of crocodylians that includes one living species, the false gharial. Many more extinct species are known, extending the range of the subfamily back to the Eocene epoch. In contrast to the false gharial, which is a freshwater species that lives only in southeast Asia, extinct tomistomines had a global distribution and lived in estuaries and along coastlines.

The classification of tomistomines among Crocodylia has been in flux; while traditionally thought to be within Crocodyloidea, molecular evidence indicates that they are more closely related to true gharials as members of Gavialoidea.

== Description ==
Tomistomines have narrow or longirostrine snouts like gharials. The living false gharial lives in fresh water and uses its long snout and sharp teeth to catch fish, although true gharials are more adapted toward piscivory, or fish-eating. Despite the similarity with gharials, the shapes of bones in tomistomine skulls link them with crocodiles. For example, both tomistomines and crocodiles have thin postorbital bars behind the eye sockets and a large socket for the fifth maxillary tooth. The splenial bone of the lower jaw is long and slender, forming a distinctive "V" shape not seen in gharials.

== Evolutionary history ==
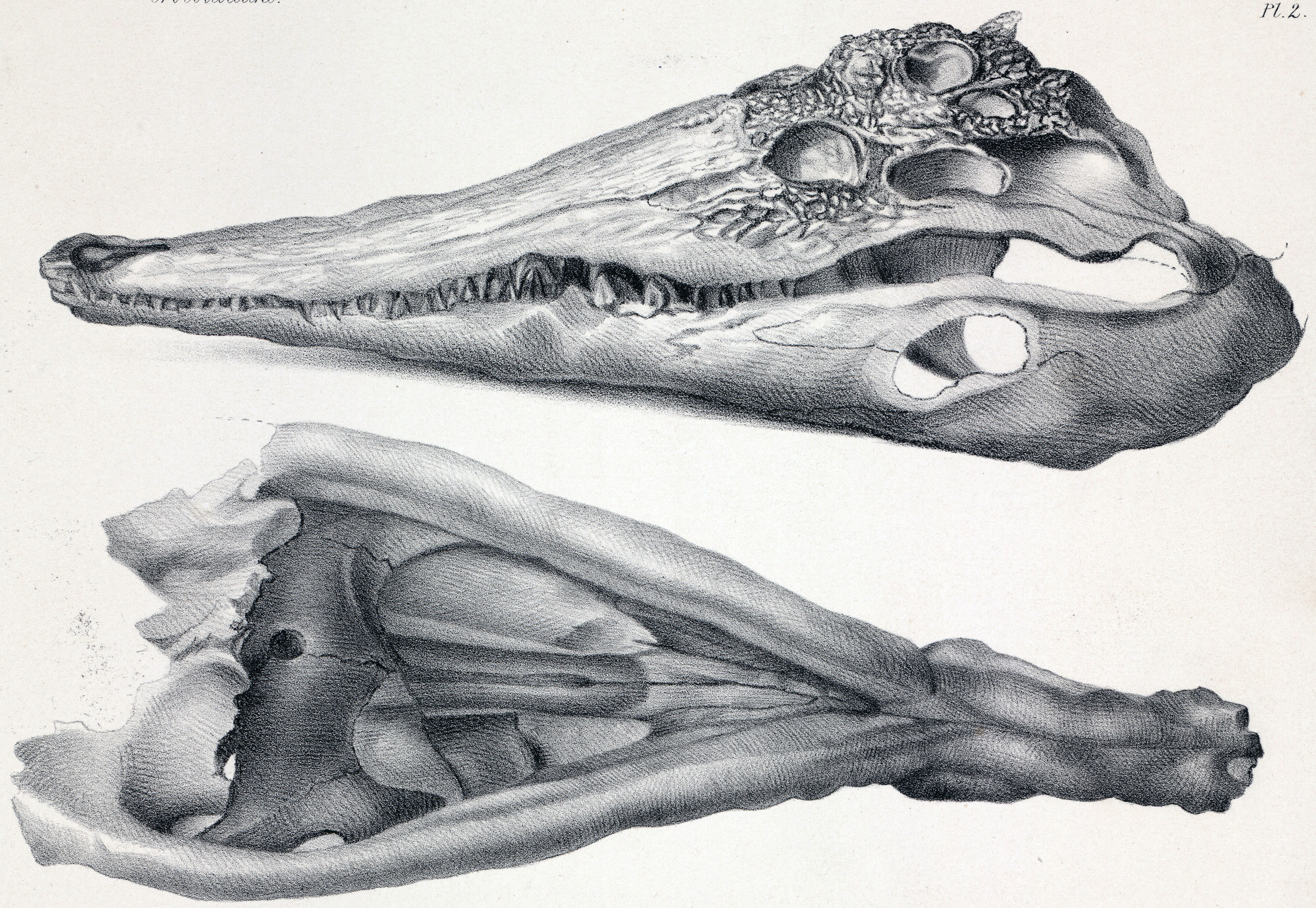
Skull of Kentisuchus toliapicus.

Tomistomines first appeared in the Eocene in Europe and North Africa. The oldest known tomistomine is Kentisuchus spenceri from England, although a possible tomistomine fossil from the Paleocene of Spain is even older. Other early tomistomines include Maroccosuchus zennaroi from Morocco and Dollosuchus dixoni from Belgium. These early tomistomines inhabited the Tethys Ocean, which covered much of Europe and North Africa during the Paleogene. Several early tomistomines are found in coastal marine deposits, suggesting that they lived along the shoreline or in estuaries. Extinct gavialoids are also thought to have been coastal animals. The marine lifestyles of these early forms likely allowed tomistomines to spread around the Tethys, forming a northern population in Europe and a southern in North Africa.

Later in the Eocene and Oligocene, tomistomines spread across Asia. The middle Eocene species Ferganosuchus planus and Dollosuchus zajsanicus are known from Kazakhstan and Kyrgyzstan. Tomistomines reached China and Taiwan with the late Eocene species Maomingosuchus petrolica and the Miocene species Penghusuchus pani. One species, "Tomistoma" tandoni, lived in India during the middle Eocene. During this time, the Indian subcontinent was separated from mainland Asia, creating a barrier to species that could not tolerate salt water. The Obik Sea, which separated Europe from Asia, also impeded travel. Tomistomines were able to cross these areas, indicating that they had tolerance to salt water.

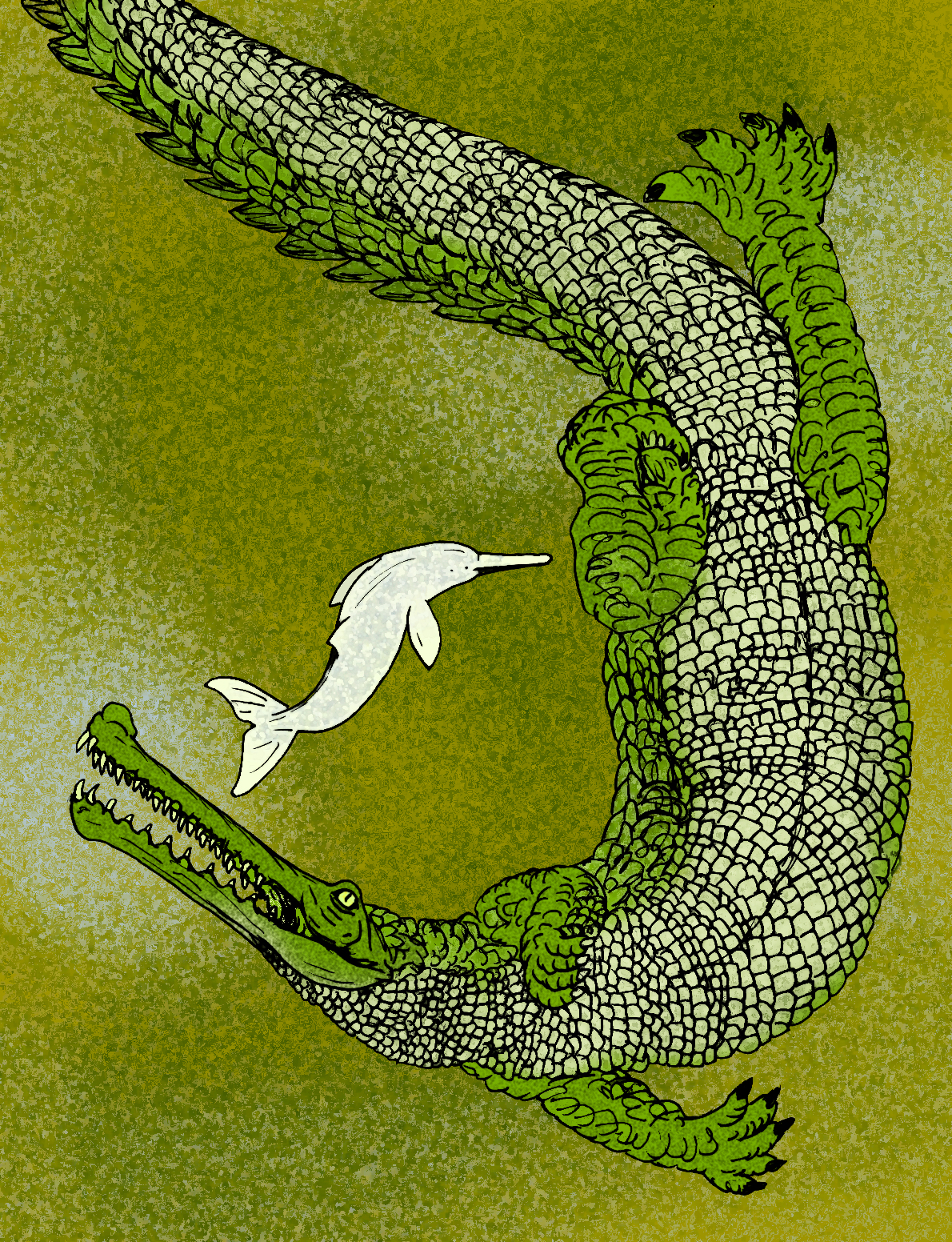
Rhamphosuchus crassidens, a giant tomistomine from India.

Tomistomines crossed the Atlantic Ocean and spread into the Americas in the Oligocene, Miocene, and Pliocene. The earliest known neotropical tomistomine is Charactosuchus kuleri from Jamaica. A close relationship has been proposed between C. kuleri and D. zajsanicus from Belgium, suggesting that tomistomines migrated from Europe to the Americas through the De Geer land bridge connecting Norway to Greenland and the North American mainland or the Thule land bridge connecting Scotland, Iceland, Greenland, and the North American mainland. The genus Thecachampsa was present along the eastern coast of North America during the Oligocene, Miocene, and Pliocene.

Tomistomines disappeared from Europe during the Oligocene but returned by the end of the epoch. They diversified and became common in the middle Miocene. One tomistomine, Tomistoma coppensi, is known from the late Miocene of Uganda. The appearance of tomistomines in central Africa is unusual because there is little evidence of late Miocene species in North Africa, an area where they must have traveled through from Europe.

Tomistomines may have traveled from Africa into Asia when Arabia collided with the Eurasian continent in the Early Miocene. However, Asian Miocene tomistomines may also have descended from the Eocene tomistomines that were already present in eastern Asia. Tomistomines spread throughout the Indian subcontinent during this time. One species, Rhamphosuchus crassidens, was one of the largest crocodilians that ever lived, growing to an estimated 8 to 11 metres (26 to 36 ft). New species such as Toyotamaphimeia machikanensis were present in Japan in the Pleistocene. In southeast Asia however, there is little fossil evidence of the tomistomines that preceded the false gharial. Therefore, its relation with extinct species is unclear.

== Phylogeny ==
Tomistominae is cladistically defined as Tomistoma schlegelii (the false gharial) and all species closer to it than to Gavialis gangeticus (the gharial) or Crocodylus rhombifer (the Cuban crocodile). This is a stem-based definition for tomistominae, and means that it includes more basal extinct tomistomine ancestors that are more closely related to the false gharial than to the gharial or crocodiles.

Hypotheses of tomistomine phylogeny

Morphological

- Crocodylia
  - Gavialidae
  - - Alligatoridae
    - Crocodylidae
      - Crocodylinae
      - Tomistominae

Molecular

- Crocodylia
  - Alligatoridae
  - - Gavialoidea
      - Gavialis
      - Tomistominae
    - Crocodylidae

Below is a cladogram based morphological studies comparing skeletal features that shows the members of Tomistominae as belonging to Crocodylidae:

- Crocodylidae
  - Crocodylinae
  - Tomistominae
    - Xaymacachampsa†
    - Megadontosuchus†
    - Kentisuchus†
    - Maroccosuchus†
    - - Dollosuchoides†
      - - - Thecachampsa†
          - - Penghusuchus†
            - Toyotamaphimeia†
        - - Tomistoma cairense†
          - - Maomingosuchus†
            - Tomistoma schlegelii False gharial
            - - Gavialosuchus†
              - Tomistoma lusitanicum†
            - - Paratomistoma†
              - Tomistoma coppensi†

Based on morphological studies of extinct taxa, the tomistomines (including the living false gharial) were long thought to be classified as crocodiles and not closely related to gavialoids. However, recent molecular studies using DNA sequencing have consistently indicated that the false gharial (Tomistoma) (and by inference other related extinct forms in Tomistominae) actually belong to Gavialoidea (and Gavialidae).

Below is a cladogram from a 2018 tip dating study by Lee & Yates simultaneously using morphological, molecular (DNA sequencing), and stratigraphic (fossil age) data that shows the tomistomines belonging to Gavialidae, and that the members traditionally belonging to Tomistominae may in fact be paraphyletic with respect to the gharial:

- Longirostres (crown group)
  - Crocodyloidea/Crocodylidae
  - Gavialoidea (stem-based group)
    - - - - Gavialidae (crown group)
            - (Gavialinae?) (stem-based group)
              - - - - - - - Gavialis gangeticus Gharial
                          - Gavialis bengawanicus†
                        - Gavialis browni†
                      - Gryposuchus colombianus†
                    - Ikanogavialis†
                  - - Gryposuchus pachakamue†
                    - Piscogavialis†
                - Harpacochampsa†
              - - - Toyotamaphimeia†
                  - Penghusuchus†
                - Gavialosuchus†
            - (Tomistominae?) (stem-based group)
              - Tomistoma lusitanicum†
              - Tomistoma schlegelii False gharial
          - Tomistoma cairense†
        - Dollosuchoides†
      - - Maroccosuchus†
        - Paratomistoma†
    - Kentisuchus†
