= Dollosuchoides =

Dollosuchoides Temporal range: Middle Eocene, 47.8–41.2 Ma

Scientific classification
- Kingdom: Animalia
- Phylum: Chordata
- Class: Reptilia
- Clade: Archosauria
- Order: Crocodilia
- Superfamily: Gavialoidea
- Genus: †Dollosuchoides; Brochu, 2007

Type species
- †Dollosuchoides densmorei Brochu, 2007

Extinct genus of reptiles

Dollosuchoides, colloquially known as the Crocodile of Maransart, is an extinct monospecific genus of gavialoid crocodilian, traditionally regarded as a member of the subfamily Tomistominae. Fossils have been found in the Brussels Formation of Maransart, Belgium and date back to the middle Eocene.

The holotype, IRScNB 482, was discovered in 1915 and it was prepared during 1926–1927 by M. Hubert, J. Mehschaert and M. Jean de Kleermaeker, and also in 1927, Louis Dollo had the holotype put on display in the Museum of Natural Sciences and he intended to describe the specimen but he died in 1931 before he was able to describe it and the specimen was eventually referred to Dollosuchus by Swinton (1937) until it was moved to its own genus by Brochu (2007). It is currently housed in the Gand Museum in Belgium.

== Phylogeny ==
Below is a cladogram based morphological studies comparing skeletal features that shows Dollosuchoides as a member of Tomistominae, related to the false gharial:

- Crocodylidae
  - Crocodylinae
  - Tomistominae
    - Xaymacachampsa†
    - Megadontosuchus†
    - Kentisuchus†
    - Maroccosuchus†
    - - Dollosuchoides†
      - - - Thecachampsa†
          - - Penghusuchus†
            - Toyotamaphimeia†
        - - Tomistoma cairense†
          - - Maomingosuchus†
            - Tomistoma schlegelii False gharial
            - - Gavialosuchus†
              - Tomistoma lusitanicum†
            - - Paratomistoma†
              - Tomistoma coppensi†

Based on morphological studies of extinct taxa, the tomistomines (including the living false gharial) were long thought to be classified as crocodiles and not closely related to gavialoids. However, recent molecular studies using DNA sequencing have consistently indicated that the false gharial (Tomistoma) (and by inference other related extinct forms in Tomistominae) actually belong to Gavialoidea (and Gavialidae).

Below is a cladogram from a 2018 tip dating study by Lee & Yates simultaneously using morphological, molecular (DNA sequencing), and stratigraphic (fossil age) data that shows Dollosuchoides as a gavialoid, more basal than the last common ancestor to both the gharial and the false gharial:

- Gavialoidea (total group)
  - - - - Gavialidae (crown group)
          - - - - - - - - Gavialis gangeticus Gharial
                        - Gavialis bengawanicus†
                      - Gavialis browni†
                    - Gryposuchus colombianus†
                  - Ikanogavialis†
                - - Gryposuchus pachakamue†
                  - Piscogavialis†
              - Harpacochampsa†
            - - - Toyotamaphimeia†
                - Penghusuchus†
              - Gavialosuchus†
          - - Tomistoma lusitanicum†
            - Tomistoma schlegelii False gharial
        - Tomistoma cairense†
      - Dollosuchoides†
    - - Maroccosuchus†
      - Paratomistoma†
  - Kentisuchus†
