= Penghusuchus =

Penghusuchus Temporal range: Late Miocene, 11.5–5.3 Ma
- Skeletal reconstruction.
- Reconstructed skull diagram.

Scientific classification
- Kingdom: Animalia
- Phylum: Chordata
- Class: Reptilia
- Order: Crocodylia
- Family: Gavialidae
- Subfamily: Gavialinae
- Genus: †Penghusuchus; Shan et al., 2009

Type species
- †Penghusuchus pani Shan et al., 2009

Extinct genus of reptiles

Penghusuchus is an extinct genus of gavialid crocodylian. It is known from a skeleton found in Middle to Upper Miocene rocks of Penghu Island, off Taiwan. The taxon was described in 2009 by Shan and colleagues; the type species is P. pani. It may be related to two other fossil Asian gavialids: Toyotamaphimeia machikanensis of Japan and Hanyusuchus sinensis of South China. It was a medium-sized gavialid with an estimated total length of 4.5 metres (15 ft).

== Discovery ==
On 25 March 2006, on the coast of Neian, Shiyu, Penghu Islands, an excavator driver Mr. Ming-Kuo Pan found a fossilized crocodylian tooth exposed in the sandstone interlayer between basaltic rocks and then dug up a whole skeleton. The skeleton is 70% complete and was found in the Yuwentao Formation of the middle Miocene (more than 10 million years ago), and its sedimentary rocks were dated as 17-15 million years ago, according to the pollen dating in the stratum, making it one of the oldest and most complete vertebrate fossils known in Taiwan. The genus name is derived from its discovery site in Penghu, and the species name honored its discoverer, Mr. Ming-Kuo Pan. It is now considered to represent a unique and extinct gavialid clade in East Asia, along with the Pleistocene Toyotamaphimeia from Japan and Taiwan and the Holocene Hanyusuchus from South China.

== Morphological Description ==
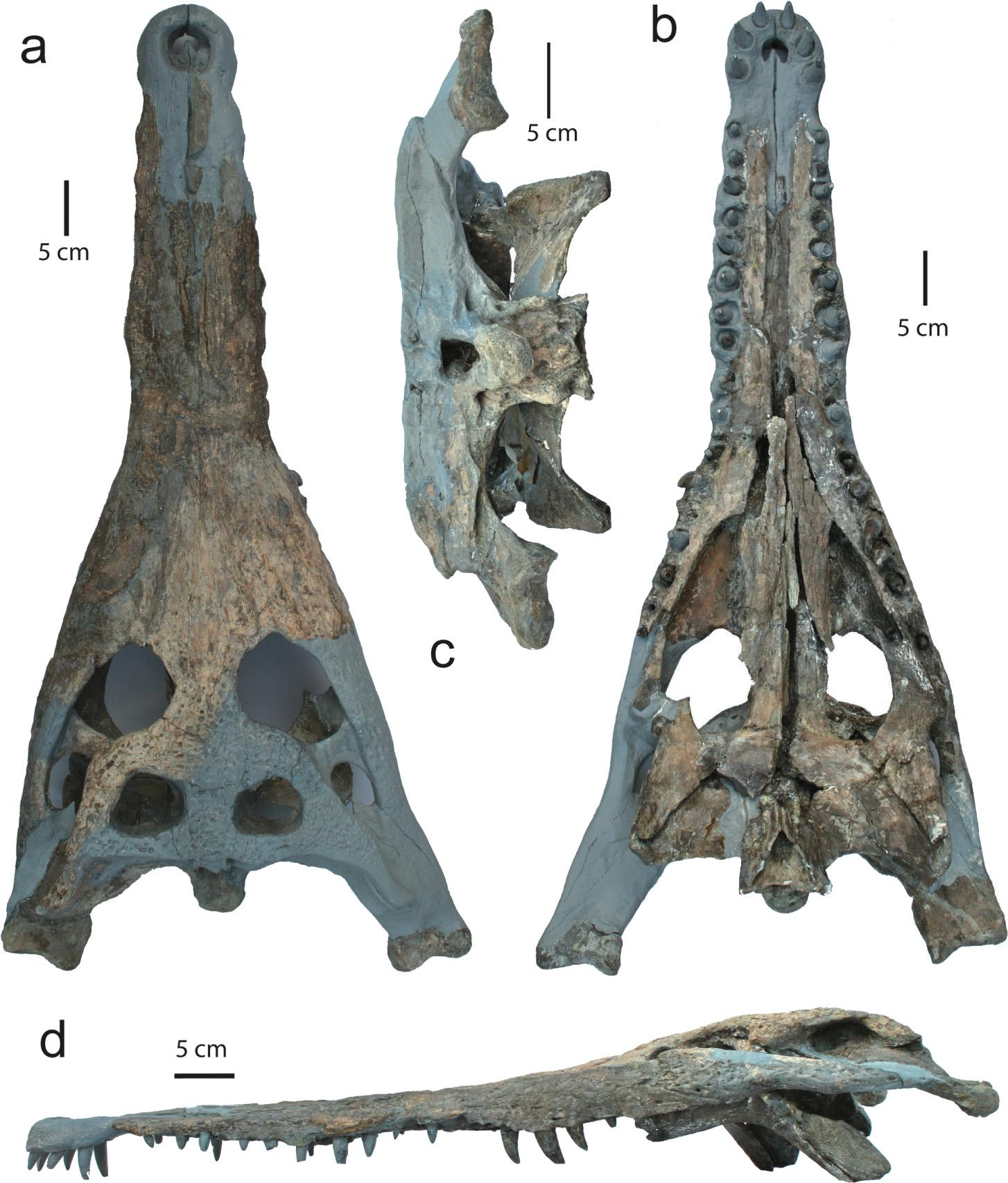
Skull of the holotype, the gray areas are reconstructed with plaster, close relatives like Toyotamaphimeia or Hanyusuchus actually showcase five premaxillary teeth.

Penghusuchus has several diagnostic characters, including: anterior process of jugal, prefrontal and lacrimal is extending as the same level; anterior process of frontal truncated and attach with nasals in W-shaped; choana is triangular with a sharp anterior angle, and its lateral borders and floor of nasopharyngeal duct form Y-shaped ridge-like prominence on ventral surface of pterygoid; presence of five maxillary teeth within the range of the suborbital fenestra; 7th maxillary tooth is the largest in the first wave of maxillary teeth and maxilla is bulges; angular with a mid-dorsal process excluding surangular from posterodorsal border of external mandibular fenestra. Among these characters, the largest 7th maxillary tooth is only present on Pleistocene Toyotamaphimeia from Japan and Taiwan and the Holocene Hanyusuchus from South China, suggest a unique shared-featured of these three East-Asian taxa. Still, the size of Penghusuchus (4.5–5 m) is estimated smaller than Hanyusuchus and Toyotamaphimeia (may over 6 m), as well as some of the characters is differ from the latter two.

Although been long classified as Tomistominae, a 2019 study noted that Penghusuchus and Toyotamaphimeia both have gavialine features, with the Penghusuchus present the following features: axial diapophysis is present on axial neural arch; paired, bifurcated hypapophysis on the ventral side of vertebrae centrum; iliac blade has a prominent anterior process; development of deltopectoral crest in the humerus is weak; midline dorsal or pelvic osteoderms is rectangular and wider than long; thick basioccipital tubera with participating of the robust exoccipital ventral process; the cranio-quadrate passage on the occipital surface is obscured by the convex process of the exoccipital; the splenial symphysis of the mandible extends to the length of about 5-7 teeth and forms a broad or narrow V in dorsal view. These characters are usually observed in gavialid, suggesting that these two East Asian taxa share mosaic features of both tomistomine and gavialid, filling the evolutionary gap of the two longeirostrine crocodylians.

Based the vertebrae length, the total length of Penghusuchus is estimated as 4.5 metres. The holotype of Penghusuchus is an osteological mature individual and reached sexual maturity based on its neurocentral suture in precaudal vertebrae is closed.

== Phylogeny ==
Below is a cladogram based morphological studies comparing skeletal features that shows Penghusuchus as a member of Tomistominae, related to the false gharial:

- Crocodylidae
  - Crocodylinae
  - Tomistominae
    - Xaymacachampsa†
    - Megadontosuchus†
    - Kentisuchus†
    - Maroccosuchus†
    - - Dollosuchoides†
      - - - Thecachampsa†
          - - Penghusuchus†
            - Toyotamaphimeia†
        - - Tomistoma cairense†
          - - Maomingosuchus†
            - Tomistoma schlegelii False gharial
            - - Gavialosuchus†
              - Tomistoma lusitanicum†
            - - Paratomistoma†
              - Tomistoma coppensi†

Based on morphological studies of extinct taxa, the tomistomines (including the living false gharial) were long thought to be classified as crocodiles and not closely related to gavialoids. However, recent molecular studies using DNA sequencing have consistently indicated that the false gharial (Tomistoma) (and by inference other related extinct forms in Tomistominae) actually belong to Gavialoidea (and Gavialidae).

Below is a cladogram from a 2018 tip dating study by Lee & Yates simultaneously using morphological, molecular (DNA sequencing), and stratigraphic (fossil age) data that shows Penghusuchus as a gavialid, related to both the gharial and the false gharial:

- Gavialidae
  - - - - - - - - Gavialis gangeticus Gharial
                - Gavialis bengawanicus†
              - Gavialis browni†
            - Gryposuchus colombianus†
          - Ikanogavialis†
        - - Gryposuchus pachakamue†
          - Piscogavialis†
      - Harpacochampsa†
    - - - Toyotamaphimeia†
        - Penghusuchus†
      - Gavialosuchus†
  - - Tomistoma lusitanicum†
    - Tomistoma schlegelii False gharial

Iijima and his colleagues named Hanyusuchus from Holocene South China. The phylogenetic analysis Penghusuchus pani, Hanyusuchus sinensis and Toyotamaphimeia machikanensis formed a monophyletic group.

- - Crocodyloidea
  - Gavialoidea
    - - †Maroccosuchus zennaroi
      - †Megadontosuchus arduini
      - †Dollosuchoides densmorei
      - †Xaymacachampsa kugleri
      - - †Kentisuchus astrei
        - †Kentisuchus spenceri
    - Gavialidae
      - †Tomistoma cairense
      - †Tomistoma coppensi
      - †Maomingosuchus petrolica
      - Tomistominae
        - Tomistoma schlegelii, false gharial
        - - †Tomistoma lusitanicum
          - - †Gavialosuchus eggenburgensis
            - - †Melitosaurus champsoides
              - †Tomistoma calaritanum
              - †Tomistoma gaudense
              - - †Thecachampsa carolinensis
                - †Thecachampsa antiqua
      - Gavialinae
        - †Paratomistoma courti
        - - - †Penghusuchus pani
            - - †Toyotamaphimeia machikanensis
              - †Hanyusuchus sinensis
          - - - †Eosuchus lerichei
              - †Eosuchus minor
            - - †Ocepesuchus eoafricanus
              - - †Eothoracosaurus mississippiensis
                - - †Thoracosaurus macrorhynchus
                  - †Thoracosaurus neocesariensis
              - - †Aktiogavialis puertoricensis
                - †Eogavialis africanum
                - - †Argochampsa krebsi
                  - - †Piscogavialis jugaliperforatus
                    - - †Ikanogavialis gameroi
                      - - †Siquisiquesuchus venezuelensis
                        - - †Dadagavialis gunai
                          - - †Gryposuchus neogaeus
                            - †Gryposuchus croizati
                            - - †Aktiogavialis caribesi
                              - †Gryposuchus pachakamue
                          - - †Gryposuchus colombianus
                            - †Rhamphosuchus crassidens
                            - †Myanmar gavialid
                            - †Gavialis lewisi
                            - †Gavialis bengawanicus
                            - - Gavialis gangeticus, gharial
                              - †Siwalik Gavialis
