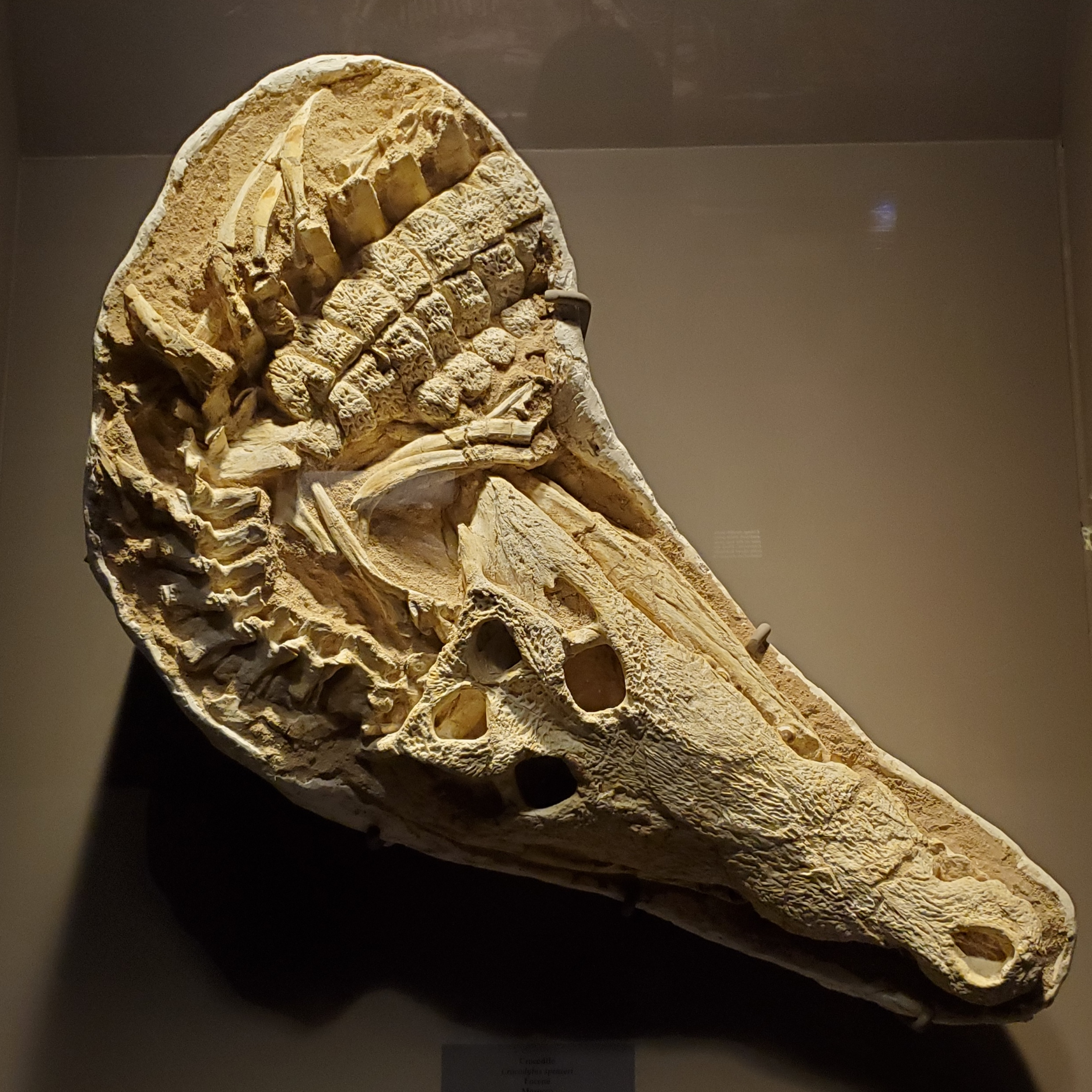
- K. spenceri fossil at the Tellus Science Museum

Scientific classification
- Kingdom: Animalia
- Phylum: Chordata
- Class: Reptilia
- Clade: Archosauria
- Order: Crocodilia
- Superfamily: Gavialoidea
- Genus: †Kentisuchus; Mook, 1955

Species
- †K. astrei Jouve, 2016; †K. spenceri (Buckland, 1836) [originally Crocodylus spenceri] (type)

Synonyms
- Crocodylus spenceri Buckland, 1836

= Kentisuchus =

Kentisuchus Temporal range: Early Eocene, 55.8–48.6 Ma

Extinct genus of reptiles

Kentisuchus is an extinct genus of gavialoid crocodylian, traditionally regarded as a member of the subfamily Tomistominae. Fossils have been found from England and France that date back to the early Eocene. The genus has also been recorded from Ukraine, but it unclear whether specimens from Ukraine are referable to Kentisuchus.

== Species ==
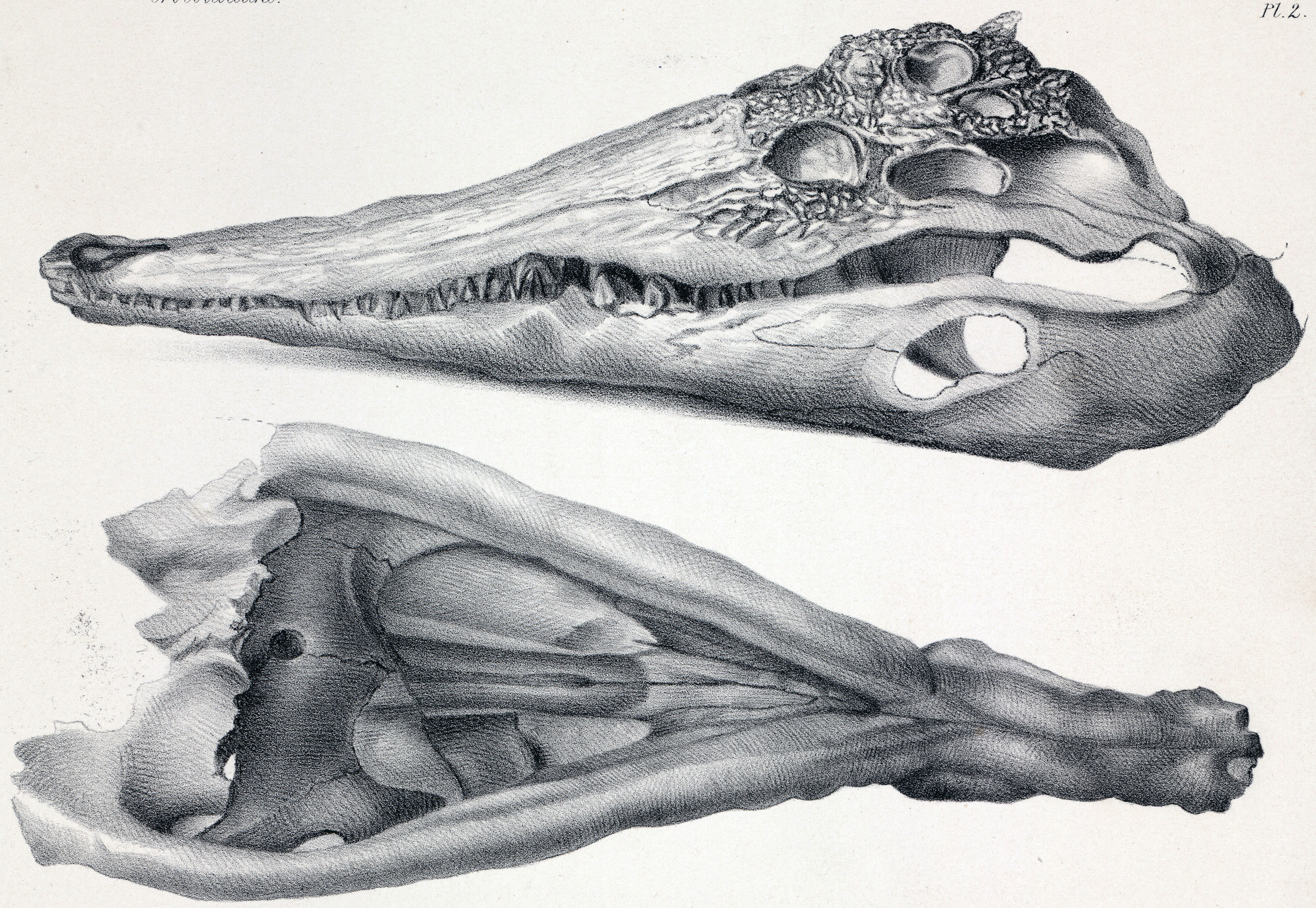
K. spenceri skull

The genus Kentisuchus was erected by Charles Mook in 1955 for the species "Crocodylus" toliapicus, described by Richard Owen, in 1849. William Buckland named "Crocodylus" spenceri on the basis of a partial skull found from the Isle of Sheppey in Kent, England. In 1888 Richard Lydekker considered "C." toliapicus synonymous with "C." champsoides and "C." arduini, named by De Zigno, and reapplied the name "C." spenceri to all of these species.

The genus name Kentisuchus was constructed only after it was realized that these specimens were clearly distinct from the genus Crocodylus and that some specimens originally assigned to "C." spenceri belonged to entirely different genera and species. "C." arduini was reassigned to the new genus Megadontosuchus in the same paper that Kentisuchus was first described in. A 2007 review of European Eocene tomistomines synonymized K. toliapicus and K. champsoides with K. spenceri.

== Phylogenetics ==
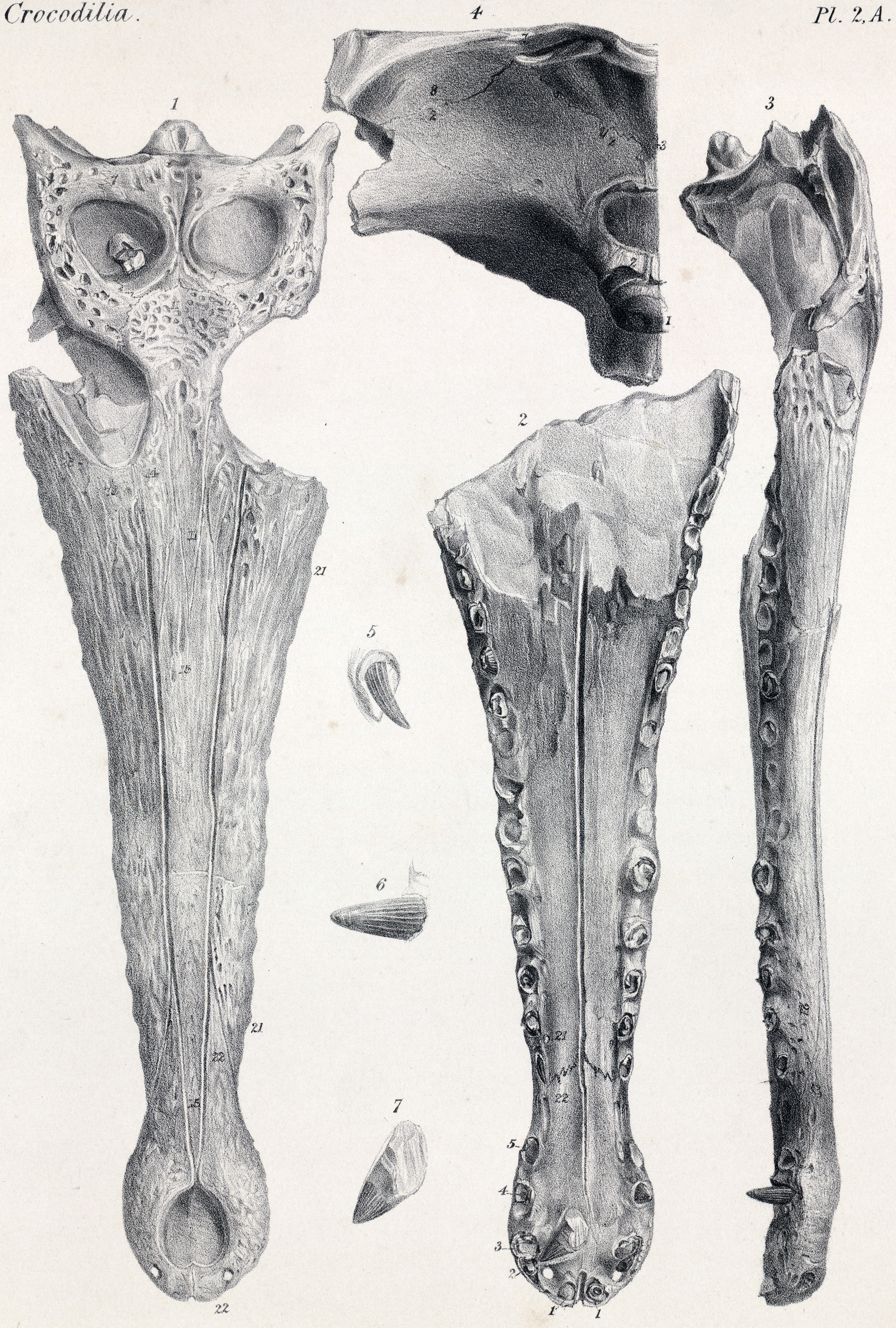
K. spenceri skull in multiple views

K. spenceri is closely related to Megadontosuchus and Dollosuchoides. An apparent close relationship between K. spenceri and Eosuchus lerichei has been used to imply that the latter species was a tomistomine, while it is now thought that Eosuchus is a basal eusuchian that lies outside the crocodilian crown group.

Below is a cladogram based morphological studies comparing skeletal features that shows Kentisuchus as a member of Tomistominae, related to the false gharial:

- Crocodylidae
  - Crocodylinae
  - Tomistominae
    - Xaymacachampsa†
    - Megadontosuchus†
    - Kentisuchus†
    - Maroccosuchus†
    - - Dollosuchoides†
      - - - Thecachampsa†
          - - Penghusuchus†
            - Toyotamaphimeia†
        - - Tomistoma cairense†
          - - Maomingosuchus†
            - Tomistoma schlegelii False gharial
            - - Gavialosuchus†
              - Tomistoma lusitanicum†
            - - Paratomistoma†
              - Tomistoma coppensi†

Based on morphological studies of extinct taxa, the tomistomines (including the living false gharial) were long thought to be classified as crocodiles and not closely related to gavialoids. However, recent molecular studies using DNA sequencing have consistently indicated that the false gharial (Tomistoma) (and by inference other related extinct forms in Tomistominae) actually belong to Gavialoidea (and Gavialidae).

Below is a cladogram from a 2018 tip dating study by Lee & Yates simultaneously using morphological, molecular (DNA sequencing), and stratigraphic (fossil age) data that shows Kentisuchus as a gavialoid, more basal than the last common ancestor to both the gharial and the false gharial:

- Gavialoidea (total group)
  - - - - Gavialidae (crown group)
          - - - - - - - - Gavialis gangeticus Gharial
                        - Gavialis bengawanicus†
                      - Gavialis browni†
                    - Gryposuchus colombianus†
                  - Ikanogavialis†
                - - Gryposuchus pachakamue†
                  - Piscogavialis†
              - Harpacochampsa†
            - - - Toyotamaphimeia†
                - Penghusuchus†
              - Gavialosuchus†
          - - Tomistoma lusitanicum†
            - Tomistoma schlegelii False gharial
        - Tomistoma cairense†
      - Dollosuchoides†
    - - Maroccosuchus†
      - Paratomistoma†
  - Kentisuchus†

== Paleobiology ==
The close relation of Kentisuchus and Dollosuchoides, which are known from European localities that were on the mainland during the early Eocene, to Megadontosuchus, which is known from Italian localities that were once part of a Tethysian archipelago, suggests that it came to these islands after a dispersal event south from mainland Europe rather than north from Africa.
