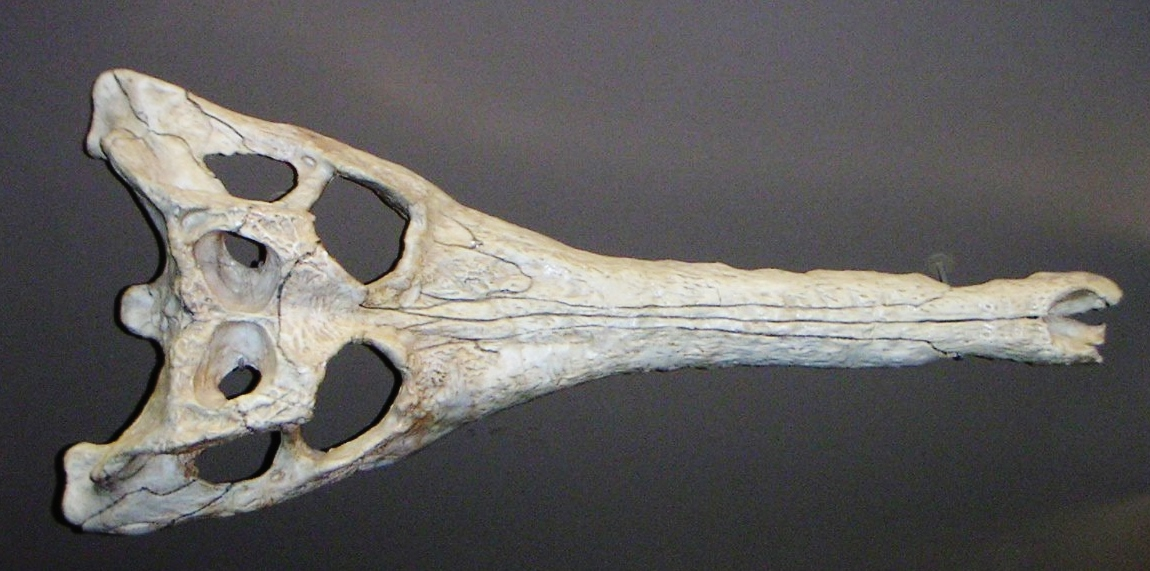
- Skull in Museum of Natural History, Wien

Scientific classification
- Kingdom: Animalia
- Phylum: Chordata
- Class: Reptilia
- Order: Crocodylia
- Family: Gavialidae
- Genus: †Gavialosuchus; Toula and Kail, 1885

Type species
- †Gavialosuchus eggenburgensis Toula and Kail, 1885

= Gavialosuchus =

Gavialosuchus Temporal range: Early Miocene, 20.4–16 Ma

Extinct genus of reptiles

Gavialosuchus is an extinct genus of gavialoid crocodylian from the early Miocene of Europe. Currently only one species is recognized, as a few other species of Gavialosuchus have since been reclassified to other genera.

== Taxonomy ==
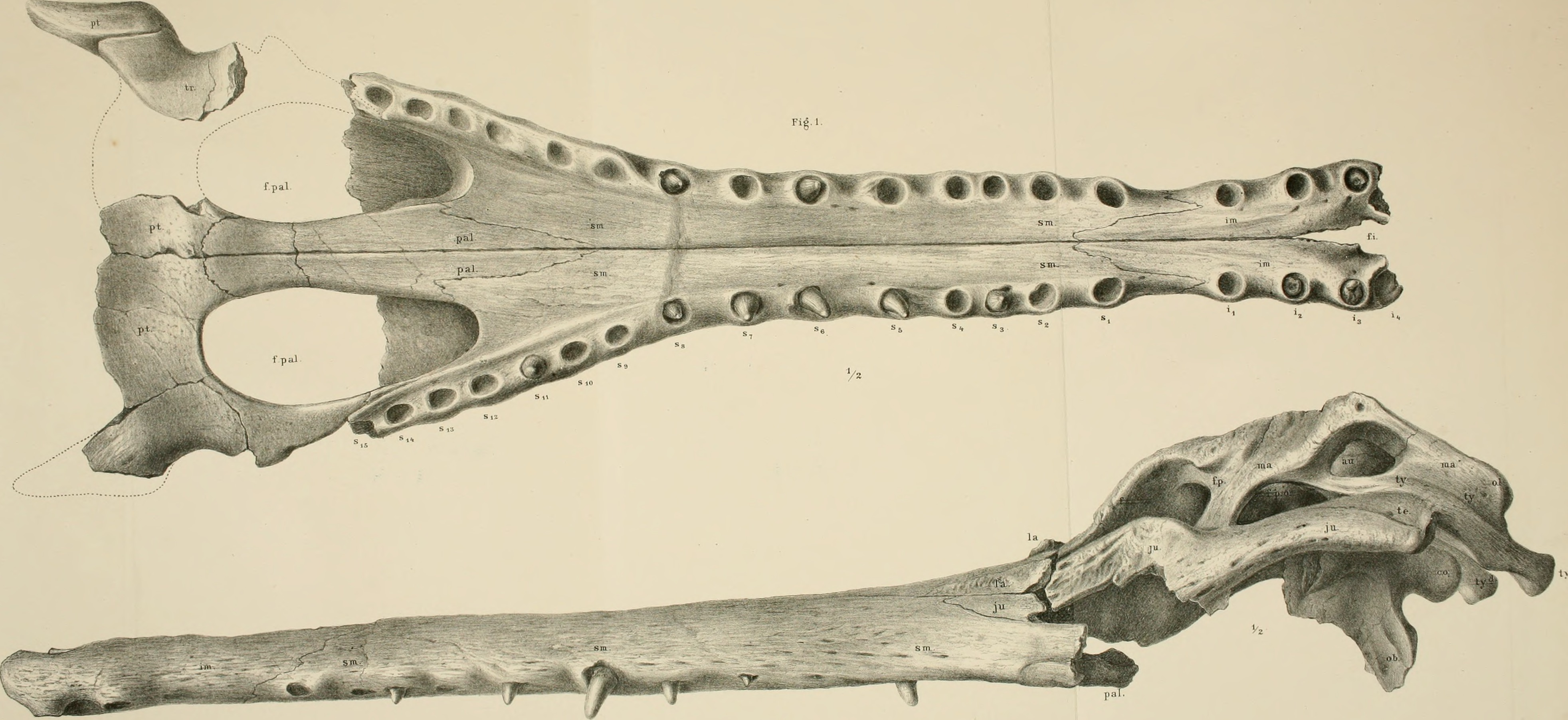
1885 illustrations of the skull

The type species, G. eggenburgensis, is known from the early Miocene of Austria. Two other species - G. americanus and G. carolinensis - have since been reclassified to other genera.

Myrick Jr. (2001) proposed synonymizing Gavialosuchus americanus with Thecachampsa antiqua. Piras et al. (2007) advocated transferring both G. americanus and G. carolinensis to Thecachampsa as distinct species of the latter genus, however. Jouve et al. (2008) retained G. americanus in Gavialosuchus and found it to be the sister group of G. eggenburgensis (G. carolinensis was not discussed). However, Jouve et al. (2008) didn't test Thecachampsa antiqua in their phylogenetic analysis. Shan et al. (2009) found that G. americanus and G. eggenburgensis are not sister taxa. However, they didn't include T. antiqua and G. carolinensis in their analysis. Christopher A. Brochu and Glenn W. Storrs (2012) tested all four species, along with other crocodyloids, and found relatively strong support for Piras et al. (2007) suggestion. Weems (2018) agreed with Piras et al. (2007) and Brochu & Storrs (2012) at americanus and carolinensis are part of Thecachampsa.

Below is a cladogram based morphological studies comparing skeletal features that shows Gavialosuchus as a member of Tomistominae, related to the false gharial:

- Crocodylidae
  - Crocodylinae
  - Tomistominae
    - Xaymacachampsa†
    - Megadontosuchus†
    - Kentisuchus†
    - Maroccosuchus†
    - - Dollosuchoides†
      - - - Thecachampsa†
          - - Penghusuchus†
            - Toyotamaphimeia†
        - - Tomistoma cairense†
          - - Maomingosuchus†
            - Tomistoma schlegelii False gharial
            - - Gavialosuchus†
              - Tomistoma lusitanicum†
            - - Paratomistoma†
              - Tomistoma coppensi†

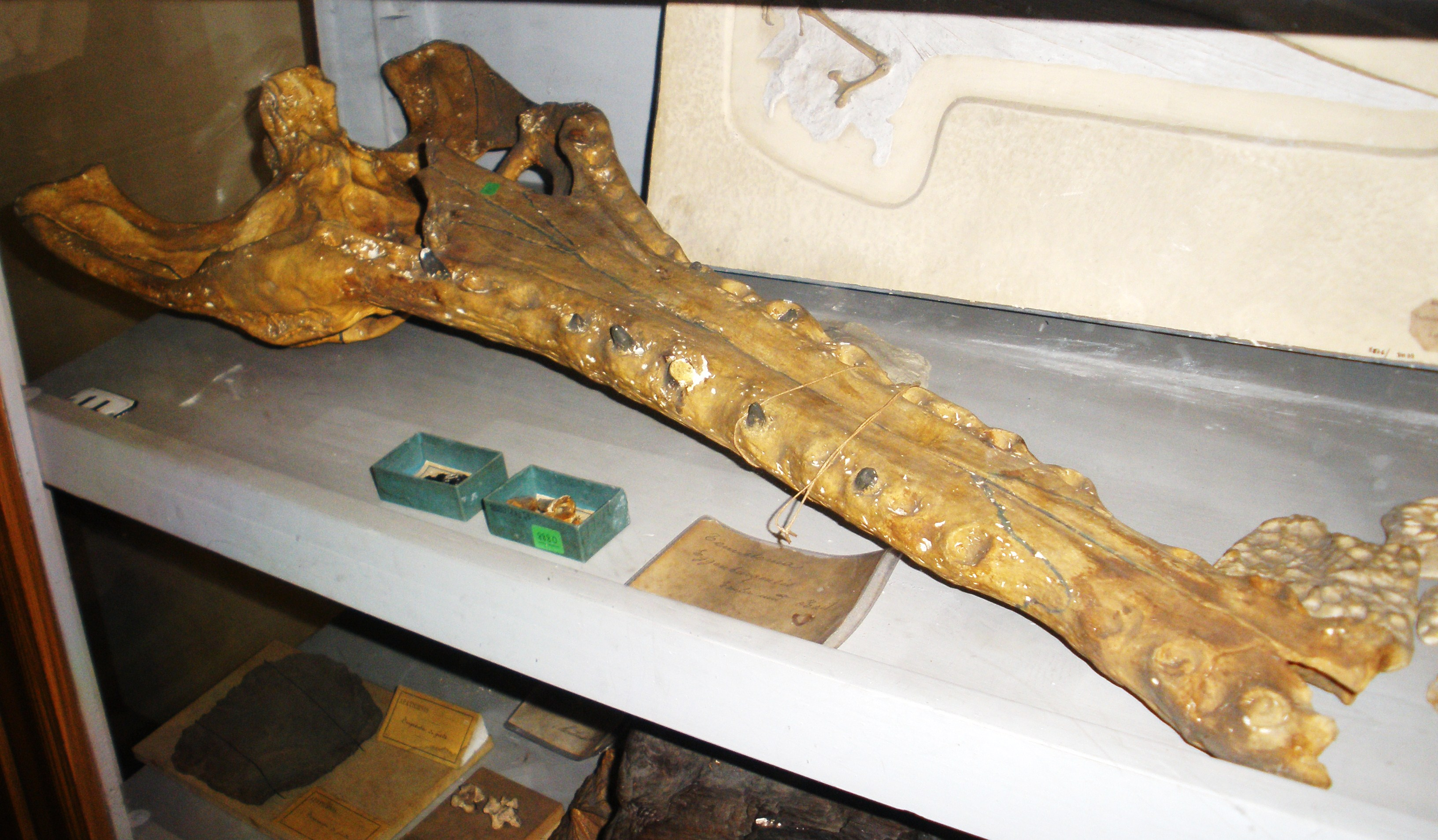
Skull shown from below

Based on morphological studies of extinct taxa, the tomistomines (including the living false gharial) were long thought to be classified as crocodiles and not closely related to gavialoids. However, recent molecular studies using DNA sequencing have consistently indicated that the false gharial (Tomistoma) (and by inference other related extinct forms in Tomistominae) actually belong to Gavialoidea.

Below is a cladogram from a 2018 tip dating study by Lee & Yates simultaneously using morphological, molecular (DNA sequencing), and stratigraphic (fossil age) data that shows Gavialosuchus as a gavialid, related to both the gharial and the false gharial:

- Gavialidae
  - - - - - - - - Gavialis gangeticus Gharial
                - Gavialis bengawanicus†
              - Gavialis browni†
            - Gryposuchus colombianus†
          - Ikanogavialis†
        - - Gryposuchus pachakamue†
          - Piscogavialis†
      - Harpacochampsa†
    - - - Toyotamaphimeia†
        - Penghusuchus†
      - Gavialosuchus†
  - - Tomistoma lusitanicum†
    - Tomistoma schlegelii False gharial

== Ecology ==
Unlike its modern fresh water relatives, Gavialosuchus was an estuarine and coastal water crocodilian, living in shallow marine waters.
