= Herugavialis =

Herugavialis Temporal range: Eocene (Lutetian), 47.8–41.2 Ma
- Skull diagram in lateral and dorsal views
- Holotype skull in lateral view

Scientific classification
- Kingdom: Animalia
- Phylum: Chordata
- Class: Reptilia
- Order: Crocodylia
- Superfamily: Gavialoidea
- Genus: †Herugavialis; Burke et al., 2026

Type species
- †Tomistoma cairense (Müller, 1927)

Extinct crocodilian genus

Herugavialis ("Horus gharial") is an extinct genus of marine gavialoid crocodilian known from the Eocene (Lutetian stage) Mokattam Formation of Egypt. It contains a single species, Herugavialis cairensis, known from near Cairo, Egypt. Herugavialis did not have a maxilla process within its lacrimal gland, whereas all extant (living) crocodilians do.

Size comparison

The species was originally described in the genus Tomistoma, which contains a single living species, the false gharial, and remained there for nearly a century, even after more comprehensive studies found it to not belong to the genus. In a 2026 study, it was moved to its own genus, Herugavialis. This genus name references the Ancient Egyptian god Horus, widely thought to be depicted in the Great Sphinx (built from the same geological formation that Herugavialis was identified from), as well as the Sphinx's lack of a nose, referencing the missing nasal region (premaxilla) of the holotype skull of Herugavialis.

== Classification ==
Holotype skull in dorsal (top) and ventral (bottom) views

In a 2018, Lee & Yates conducted a phylogenetic anlaysis simultaneously using morphological, molecular (DNA sequencing), and stratigraphic (fossil age) data. They recovered Tomistoma cairense as a gavialoid, more basal than the last common ancestor of both the gharial (Gavialis gangeticus) and the false gharial (Tomistoma schlegelii):

- Gavialoidea (stem-based group)
  - - - - Gavialidae (crown group)
          - - - - - - - - Gavialis gangeticus (gharial)
                        - †Gavialis bengawanicus
                      - †Gavialis browni
                    - †Gryposuchus colombianus
                  - †Ikanogavialis
                - - †Gryposuchus pachakamue
                  - †Piscogavialis
              - †Harpacochampsa
            - - - †Toyotamaphimeia
                - †Penghusuchus
              - †Gavialosuchus
          - - †Tomistoma lusitanicum
            - Tomistoma schlegelii (false gharial)
        - †Tomistoma cairense
      - †Dollosuchoides
    - - †Maroccosuchus
      - †Paratomistoma
  - †Kentisuchus

Herugavialis portrait and skull anachronistically depicted alongside the The Great Sphinx and pyramids of Giza

Tomistoma cairense was placed in the new genus Herugavialis in 2026, acknowledging that its inclusion within Tomistoma rendered that genus paraphyletic. Herugavialis was recovered more closely related to the gharial than the false gharial, within Gavialidae. These phylogenetic results are displayed in the cladogram below:

- Gavialoidea
  - - †Maroccosuchus zennaroi
    - - †Dollosuchoides densmorei
      - †Kentisuchus spenceri
  - - †Maomingosuchus petrolica
    - Gavialidae
      - Tomistoma schlegelii (false gharial)
      - - - †Hanyusuchus sinensis
          - †Toyotamaphimeia machikanensis
        - - †Penghusuchus pani
          - - - - †Eosuchus lerichei
                - †Eosuchus minor
              - - †Eothoracosaurus mississippiensis
                - - †Thoracosaurus isorhynchus
                  - - †Portugalosuchus azenhae
                    - †Thoracosaurus neocesariensis
            - - †Herugavialis cairensis
              - - - - †Gavialosuchus eggenburgensis
                    - †Melitosaurus champsoides
                  - - - †'Tomistoma' lusitanica
                      - - †'Tomistoma' calaritanum
                        - †'Tomistoma' gaudense
                    - - †Thecachampsa sericodon
                      - - †Thecachampsa antiquus
                        - †Thecachampsa carolinensis
                - - †Paratomistoma courti
                  - - †Sutekhsuchus dowsoni
                    - - †'Tomistoma' coppensi
                      - - †Eogavialis andrewsi
                        - - †Eogavialis africanum
                          - - †Dadagavialis gunai
                            - - - †Argochampsa krebsi
                                - - †Aktiogavialis caribesi
                                  - - †Piscogavialis jugaliperforatus
                                    - - †Ikanogavialis gameroi
                                      - †Siquisiquesuchus venezuelensis
                              - - †Gryposuchus pachakamue
                                - - †Gryposuchus colombianus
                                  - - †Gryposuchus neogaeus
                                    - - †Gryposuchus croizati
                                      - - †Gavialis lewisi
                                        - - †Gavialis browni
                                          - Gavialis gangeticus (gharial)
