= Ferganosuchus =

Ferganosuchus Temporal range: Middle Eocene

Scientific classification
- Domain: Eukaryota
- Kingdom: Animalia
- Phylum: Chordata
- Class: Reptilia
- Clade: Archosauromorpha
- Clade: Archosauriformes
- Order: Crocodilia
- Family: Gavialidae
- Subfamily: Tomistominae
- Genus: †Ferganosuchus; Efimov, 1982

Type species
- †Ferganosuchus planus Efimov, 1982

Extinct genus of reptiles

Ferganosuchus is an extinct monospecific genus of gavialid crocodilian. The genus is thought to be a tomistomine, although it has been suggested that Ferganosuchus may be a more basal gavialoid. Fossils have been found in the region of Kazakhstan and Kyrgyzstan that date back the middle Eocene. The genus is well known from fairly complete specimens, unlike most other Asian tomistomines, whose remains tend to be more fragmentary.
