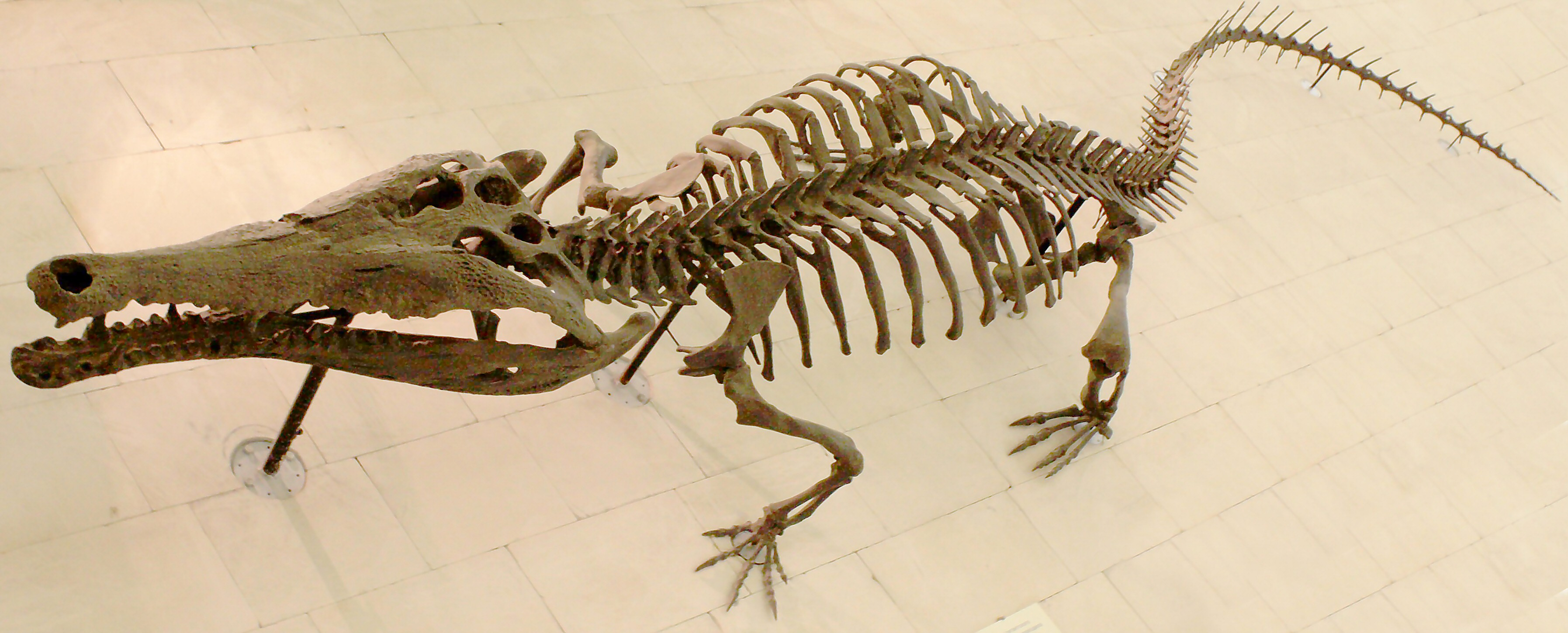
- Toyotamaphimeia machikanensis skeleton
- Reconstructed skull diagram

Scientific classification
- Kingdom: Animalia
- Phylum: Chordata
- Class: Reptilia
- Order: Crocodylia
- Family: Gavialidae
- Subfamily: Gavialinae
- Genus: †Toyotamaphimeia; Aoki, 1983

Type species
- †Toyotamaphimeia machikanensis Kobatake et al., 1965

Species
- †Toyotamaphimeia machikanensis (Kobatake et al., 1965); †Toyotamaphimeia taiwanicus (Shikama, 1972)

Synonyms
- Tomistoma machikanensis; Tomistoma taiwanicus

= Toyotamaphimeia =

Toyotamaphimeia Temporal range: Middle Pleistocene, 0.8–0.3 Ma Possible Pliocene record

Extinct genus of reptiles

Toyotamaphimeia (named after Toyotama-hime) is a genus of extinct gavialid crocodylian which lived in Japan and Taiwan during the Middle Pleistocene. A specimen recovered in 1964 at Osaka University during the construction of a new science building has been dated to around 430–380 thousand years old based on the stratum in which it was found. Toyotamaphimeia was a fairly large crocodylian measuring approximately 6.3–7.3 metres (21–24 ft) long. Two species are named, T. machikanensis from Japan and T. taiwanicus from Taiwan, both originally described as members of the genus Tomistoma.

== History and naming ==
Skeletal reconstruction and size comparison of the holotype, showcasing known elements and healed pathologies.

The first bones belonging to Toyotamaphimeia were discovered on May 3, 1964, during the construction of a new school building on the grounds of Ôsaka University. A field survey was conducted shortly afterwards, confirming the presence of more fossils, however not yet identifying their crocodilian nature. Following the survey several digs were organized starting on 9 June 1964. The skull was found on September 17 during the second dig. A third excavation was held in December which yielded more material of Toyotamaphimeia as well as fossil shellfish, insects and plant remains. Finally a fourth excavation took place in January 1965. Following analysis of the fossils, the material was assigned to the genus Tomistoma and named Tomistoma machikanense. In 1983, 18 years after the initial discovery, the skull was redescribed and deemed different enough from Tomistoma to erect a new genus, Toyotamaphimeia creating the comb. nov. Toyotamaphimeia machikanensis. In turn, Aoki also changed the species name from machikanense to machikanensis, as the new genus name was feminine. Similar remains were also known from Taiwan and had been classified as Tomistoma taiwanicus and Toyotamaphimeia sp. respectively, the former of which suggested as a species of Toyotamaphimeia already in 1983. A 2023 study concluded that both belonged to a single taxon: the Taiwanese form retained the species name, but was placed in Toyotamaphimeia, creating the new combination T. taiwanicus.

The generic name derives from Toyotama-hime, a goddess of Japanese mythology with the ability to change her appearance to that of a crocodile. The species epithet of T. machikanensis means "from Mountain Machikane" ((ja:待兼山)), while that of T. taiwanicus derives from Taiwan.

== Description ==
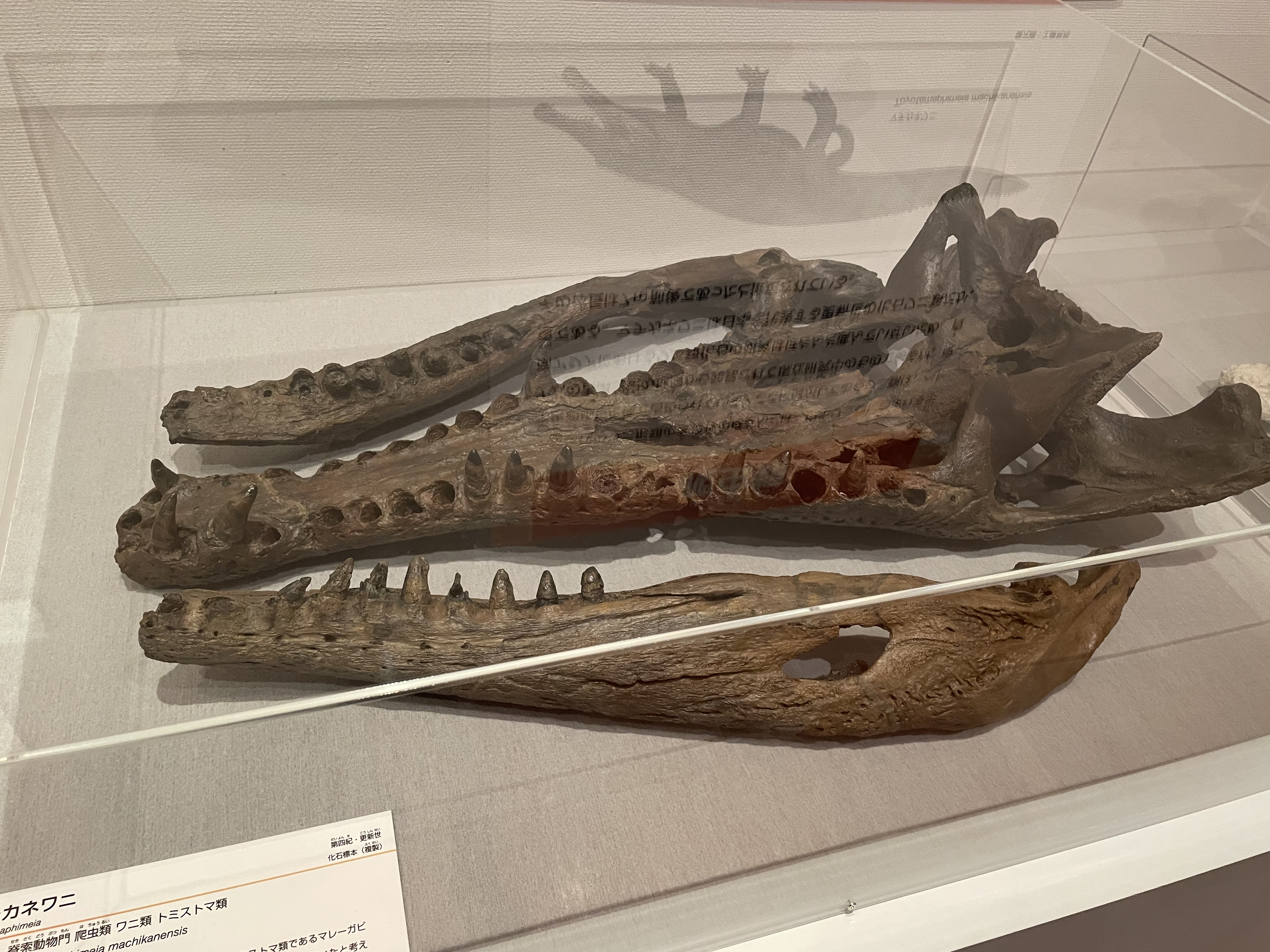
Skull bones

The holotype of Toyotamaphimeia is a nearly complete skeleton consisting of a skull, an entire cervical and dorsal series of vertebrae, various ribs, 33 osteoderms as well as almost half the bones of the limbs, hip region and pectoral girdle. Most of the tail past the 3rd caudal vertebra is missing, making it difficult to determine the exact length of the animal. The first research paper that described the type species tentatively suggested a body length estimate of 8 metres (26 ft) based on the assumption that the caudal vertebrae in total would measure 4 metres (13 ft) long. Subsequent research papers in the 2020s estimated that both species of Toyotamaphimeia are roughly similar in size, approximately between 6.3 and 7.3 metres (21 and 24 ft) based on vertebrae and skull length.

Toyotamaphimeia's skull is triangular in shape and longirostrine. It's fairly large, measuring over 1 metre (3.3 ft) from the tip of the premaxillary to the posterior end of the parietal. Most of that length is taken up by the maxilla and the nasal bones penetrate the premaxilla dorsally, extending deep into the premaxilla to the level of the 3rd maxillary alveoli, but not coming in contact with the nares. The skulltable of the holotype is crushed and damaged just before the orbits. The dentaries are broken off at the anterior end and each preserves 10 alveoli. The absence of any grooves or confluence of alveoli suggests that the specimen is mature, which is consistent with its great size.

== Paleobiology ==
The holotype specimen (MOUF00001) preserves a series of pathologies described by Katsura in 2004. The mandible is broken off at the tip, the tibia and fibula have been fractured and healed and some of the osteoderms present preserve healing bite marks. The fact that these injuries healed is evidence that the animal survived for a while after being injured and Katsura suggests that they may have been the result of intraspecific fights, furthermore hypothesizing that this could mean the Osaka University specimen may have been a male.

Although the holotype of Toyotamaphimeia is the first substantial and best preserved evidence of crocodilians in Japan, there are other remains found across the islands. The northernmost finds were made in the Iwate Prefecture (northern Honshu) while their range extends south to Nagasaki Prefecture (Kyushu Island). At this latitude Toyotamaphimeia would have existed at the thermal limit of crocodilians. The Ibaraki Formation, where the remains of Toyotamaphimeia have been found, is part of the Osaka Group, which consists of lacustrine and fluvial deposits of the Pliocene to Pleistocene. Specifically, the fossils belong to the Kasuri Tuff, which dates to the Chibanian age of the Pleistocene. Molluscs, pollen and plant fossils (species of lotus and water caltrop found in the Kasuri Tuff suggest a moderate climate. Toyotamaphimeia would have most likely coexisted in this area alongside Stegodon orientalis, Cervus kazusensis, Panthera youngi, Bubalus teihardi and Stephanorhinus. The pollen found in the region suggests a vegetation consisting of alders, beeches, pines and Cryptomeria (Japanese redwood).

== Phylogeny ==
Below is a cladogram based morphological studies comparing skeletal features that shows Toyotamaphimeia as a member of Tomistominae, related to the false gharial:

- Crocodylidae
  - Crocodylinae
  - Tomistominae
    - †Xaymacachampsa
    - †Megadontosuchus
    - †Kentisuchus
    - †Maroccosuchus
    - - †Dollosuchoides
      - - - †Thecachampsa
          - - †Penghusuchus
            - †Toyotamaphimeia
        - - †Tomistoma cairense
          - - †Maomingosuchus
            - Tomistoma schlegelii (false gharial)
            - - †Gavialosuchus
              - †Tomistoma lusitanicum
            - - †Paratomistoma
              - †Tomistoma coppensi

Based on morphological studies of extinct taxa, the tomistomines (including the living false gharial) were long thought to be classified as crocodiles and not closely related to gavialoids. However, recent molecular studies using DNA sequencing have consistently indicated that the false gharial (Tomistoma) (and by inference other related extinct forms in Tomistominae) actually belong to Gavialoidea (and Gavialidae). Following this interpretation, Iijima et al. found Toyotamaphimeia to have been a basal member of Gavialinae, clading together with the Miocene Penghusuchus and the then newly named Hanyusuchus. The resulting group was later supported by a 2023 study following the inclusion of a geologically older species Toyotamaphimeia taiwanicus, although the resulting tree was poorly resolved and contained a large polytomy. In said study, Cho and Tsai argued that Toyotamaphimeia originated in Taiwan and evolved to acquire a large body size with gigantothermic physiology, and that it eventually migrated out of Taiwan and dispersed farther north to Japan. They also stated that tomistomines were variably recovered as either a group of crocodyloid or gavialoid depending on whether or not postcranial characters were included. The presence of an East Asian lineage, however, was found through both methods.

The phylogenetic trees of Iijima et al. (2022) as well as Cho and Tsai (2023) are featured below.

- Gavialidae
  - †Tomistoma cairense
  - †Tomistoma coppensi
  - †Maomingosuchus petrolica
  - Tomistominae
    - Tomistoma schlegelii, false gharial
    - - †Tomistoma lusitanicum
      - - †Gavialosuchus eggenburgensis
        - - †Melitosaurus champsoides
          - †Tomistoma calaritanum
          - †Tomistoma gaudense
          - - †Thecachampsa carolinensis
            - †Thecachampsa antiqua
  - Gavialinae
    - †Paratomistoma courti
    - - - †Penghusuchus pani
        - - †Toyotamaphimeia machikanensis
          - †Hanyusuchus sinensis
      - - - †Eosuchus lerichei
          - †Eosuchus minor
        - - †Ocepesuchus eoafricanus
          - - †Eothoracosaurus mississippiensis
            - - †Thoracosaurus macrorhynchus
              - †Thoracosaurus neocesariensis
          - - †Aktiogavialis puertoricensis
            - †Eogavialis africanum
            - - †Argochampsa krebsi
              - - †Piscogavialis jugaliperforatus
                - - †Ikanogavialis gameroi
                  - - †Siquisiquesuchus venezuelensis
                    - - †Dadagavialis gunai
                      - - †Gryposuchus neogaeus
                        - †Gryposuchus croizati
                        - - †Aktiogavialis caribesi
                          - †Gryposuchus pachakamue
                      - - †Gryposuchus colombianus
                        - †Rhamphosuchus crassidens
                        - †Myanmar gavialid
                        - †Gavialis lewisi
                        - †Gavialis bengawanicus
                        - - Gavialis gangeticus, gharial
                          - †Siwalik Gavialis

- - †Xaymacachampsa kugleri
  - †Maroccosuchus zennaroi
  - - †Kentisuchus astrei
    - †Kentisuchus spenceri
  - - †Megadontosuchus arduini
    - - †Dollosuchoides densmorei
      - - - - †Thecachampsa antiqua
            - †Thecachampsa carolinensis
          - - †Penghusuchus pani
            - - †Toyotamaphimeia taiwanicus
              - - †Hanyusuchus sinensis
                - † NTUM-VP-200702
              - - †Toyotamaphimeia machikanensis
                - - † Kishiwada Toyotamaphimeia
                  - † Yage tomistomine
        - - †Tomistoma cairense
          - - †Maomingosuchus petrolica
            - †Paratomistoma courti
            - †Tomistoma coppensi
            - - Tomistoma schlegelii, false gharial
              - - †Gunggamarandu maunale
                - †Melitosaurus champsoides
                - - †Tomistoma lusitanicum
                  - - †Gavialosuchus eggenburgensis
                    - - †Tomistoma gaudense
                      - †Tomistoma calaritanum
