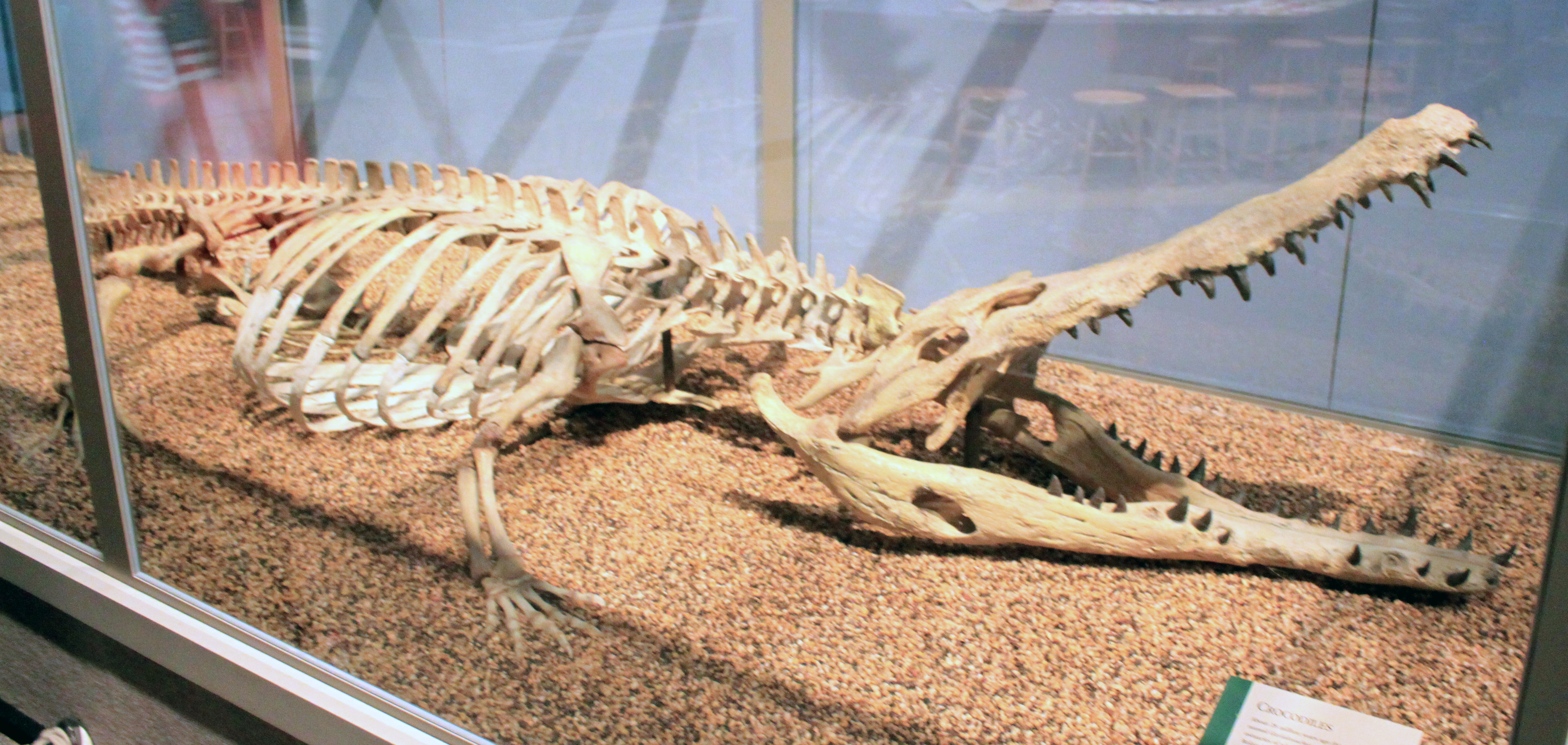
- T. carolinensis skeleton

Scientific classification
- Kingdom: Animalia
- Phylum: Chordata
- Class: Reptilia
- Order: Crocodylia
- Superfamily: Gavialoidea
- Family: Gavialidae
- Subfamily: Tomistominae
- Genus: †Thecachampsa; Cope, 1867

Species
- †T. sericodon Cope, 1867 (type); †T. antiquus (Leidy, 1851) [originally Crocodilus antiquus]); †T. carolinensis (Erickson and Sawyer, 1996 [originally Gavialosuchus carolinensis])

= Thecachampsa =

Thecachampsa Temporal range: Miocene, 15.97–5.3 Ma
- Skeletal reconstruction and size comparison of T. antiquus

Extinct genus of reptiles

Thecachampsa is an extinct genus of large marine tomistomine crocodylian. Fossils have been found from the eastern United States in deposits of Miocene age. Those named in the 19th century were distinguished primarily by the shape of their teeth.

There has been considerable disagreement on the validity and spelling of the species within the genus. Weems (2018) considers three valid species: T. sericodon (the narrow-snouted species, with teeth adapted to pierce and cut), T. antiquus (a moderately robust form with conical teeth) and T. carolinensis (the widest-snouted species, also with conical teeth capable of crushing); with the type specimen of T. americana being a junior synonym of T. sericodon.

== Description ==
Skull diagram of T. antiquus

Thecachampsa, like other "tomistomines" of the Oligocene and Miocene, was considerably larger than living crocodilians. Like living gharials, it had a long, slender snout with interlocking teeth whose shape depended on the species. Unlike its living relatives, Thecachampsa was marine, inhabiting estuaries and shallow coastal waters. Other marine fossils such as sea snail and bivalve shells, shark teeth, and barnacles have been found alongside remains of Thecachampsa and similar taxa. It possessed 5 tooth positions on the premaxilla (the second being the smallest), and on the maxilla the 5th and 6th teeth were the largest, with the snout noticeably widening at this level.

== Species ==
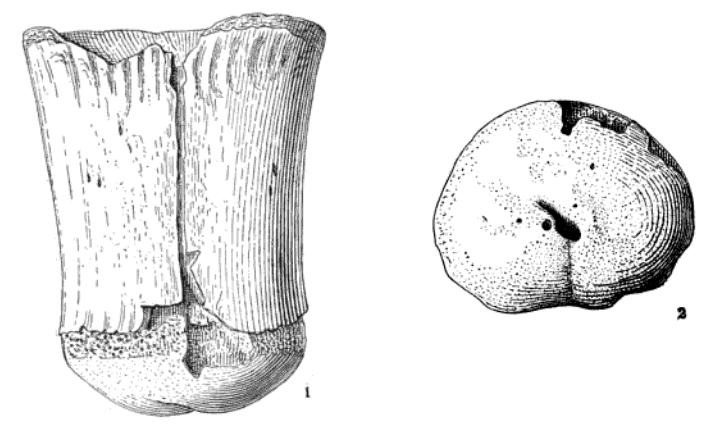
A vertebra in dorsal (top) and posterior (end) view, referred to Thecachampsa by William Bullock Clark in 1901

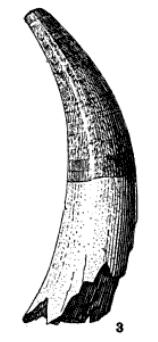
A tooth referred to Thecachampsa sericodon by William Bullock Clark in 1901

In 1852, American paleontologist Joseph Leidy described Crocodylus antiquus from Miocene deposits in the Lee family's ancestral home in Virginia. The holotype was a tooth found in the Calvert Formation of Virginia. Leidy also described additional material including several teeth and osteoderms, two vertebrae, a rib, and an ungual phalanx or claw bone. The new genus Thecachampsa was erected by Edward Drinker Cope in 1867, containing two species, T. sericodon and T. contusor, both also based on teeth, but no type species was designated. Cope (1882) designated T. sericodon as the Thecachampsa type species. T. sericodon was distinguished from T. antiqua by its slender, curved teeth, each with a sharp edge near the base of the posterior margin (T. antiqua only possessed sharp edges along a small area near the tip of the posterior margin).

Crocodilian material found from Miocene deposits in the eastern United States has often been attributed to Thecachampsa, even isolated teeth with few distinguishable features. In 1869, Cope named a fourth species, T. sicaria, from a jaw fragment and a dorsal vertebra. Unlike those of other species, the teeth of T. sicaria were lenticular (lens-shaped) in cross section with sharp cutting edges. That year, Othniel Charles Marsh named another species of Thecachampsa, "T. squankensis", after the place of its discovery, Squankum, New Jersey, but that name is a nomen nudum because Marsh provided no description, diagnosis, or type specimen. Cope named a new species, T. fastigiata, in 1870 as a reassignment of Crocodylus fastigiatus, named by Leidy in 1852. These species were distinguished from one another primarily by differences in the shape of the teeth, the most common material found. The genus was synonymized with Crocodylus in 1973, but has since been regarded as valid.

A clear phylogenetic distinction between North American Gavialosuchus and the type species of Gavialosuchus, Gavialosuchus eggenburgensis Toula and Kail 1885 from the Miocene of Austria, was clear once they were analyzed together in phylogenetic analyses. In 2001, A.C. Myrick synonymized Gavialosuchus americanus, another "tomistomine" from the eastern United States, with T. antiqua. Myrick also synonymized Tomistoma lusitanicum, a "tomistomine" from Portugal, with Thecachampsa, though this has not been supported by subsequent analyses that clearly distinguish them. The genus name Thecachampsa has priority over the other two, as it was erected earlier. A geologically younger species was first described from Florida as Tomistoma americanus in 1915, with remains having been found from the Kirkwood Formation in New Jersey, the Calvert Formation in Maryland, the Chesapeake Group of Virginia, and the Pungo River and Yorktown Formations of North Carolina. Remains have also been found from Florida, California, Baja California, and, more recently, Costa Rica. Fossils of the species are present in deposits that range in age from the late Early Miocene to the early Pliocene. A few studies such as that of Jouve et al. (2008) have kept the species within Gavialosuchus, leaving T. antiqua as the only species within Thecachampsa, though they didn't test Thecachampsa antiqua in their phylogenetic analysis, and most other analyses recover a clade including all North American forms that had previously been referred Gavialosuchus with a broad phylogenetic separation between them and G. eggenburgensis.

The cladogram below follows from Brochu and Storrs (2012).

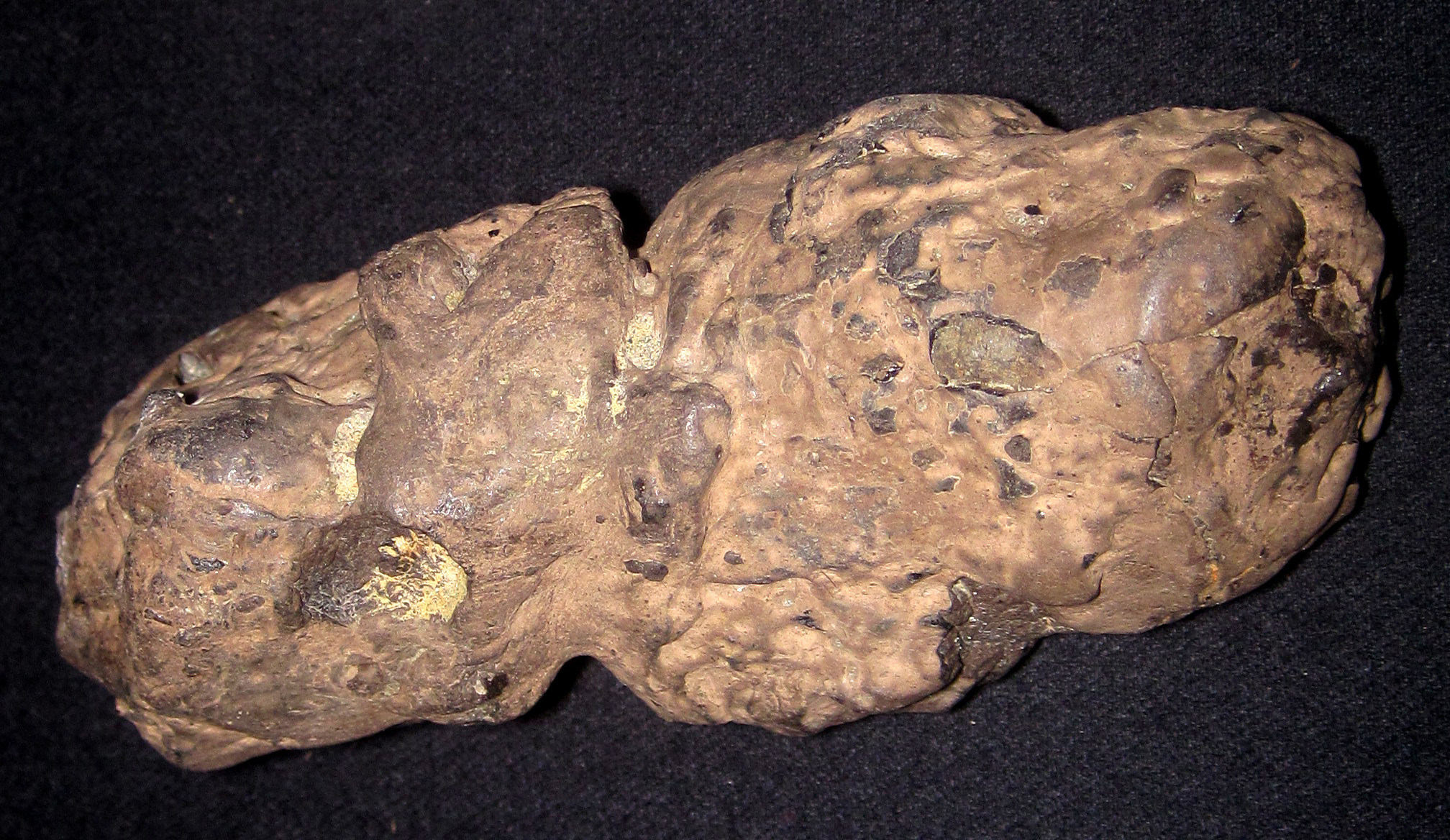
Coprolite attributed to Thecachampsa

- Crocodyloidea
  - "Asiatosuchus" germanicus
  - Prodiplocynodon langi
  - - Asiatosuchus grangeri
    - "Crocodylus" affinis
    - "Crocodylus" depressifrons
    - - Brachyuranochampsa eversolei
      - "Crocodylus" acer
      - Crocodylidae
        - Tomistominae
          - Kentisuchus spenceri
          - - Dollosuchoides densmorei
            - Megadontosuchus arduini
            - - - - Gavialosuchus eggenburgensis
                  - Toyotamaphimeia machikanensis
                - - Tomistoma lusitanicum
                  - Tomistoma schlegelii
              - - "Tomistoma" cairense
                - - Thecachampsa antiqua
                  - Thecachampsa americana
                  - Thecachampsa carolinense
                - - Penghusuchus pani
                  - - Paratomistoma courti
                    - "Tomistoma" petrolica
        - Crocodylinae
          - "Crocodylus" megarhinus
          - Mekosuchinae
            - Kambara implexidens
            - Australosuchus clarkae
            - - Trilophosuchus rackhami
              - Quinkana
          - - - "Crocodylus" pigotti
              - "Crocodylus" gariepensis
              - - Euthecodon arambourgi
                - Euthecodon brumpti
            - Osteolaeminae
              - Rimasuchus lloydi
              - - Voay robustus
                - - Osteolaemus osborni
                  - Osteolaemus tetraspis
            - - Mecistops cataphractus
              - Crocodylus spp.

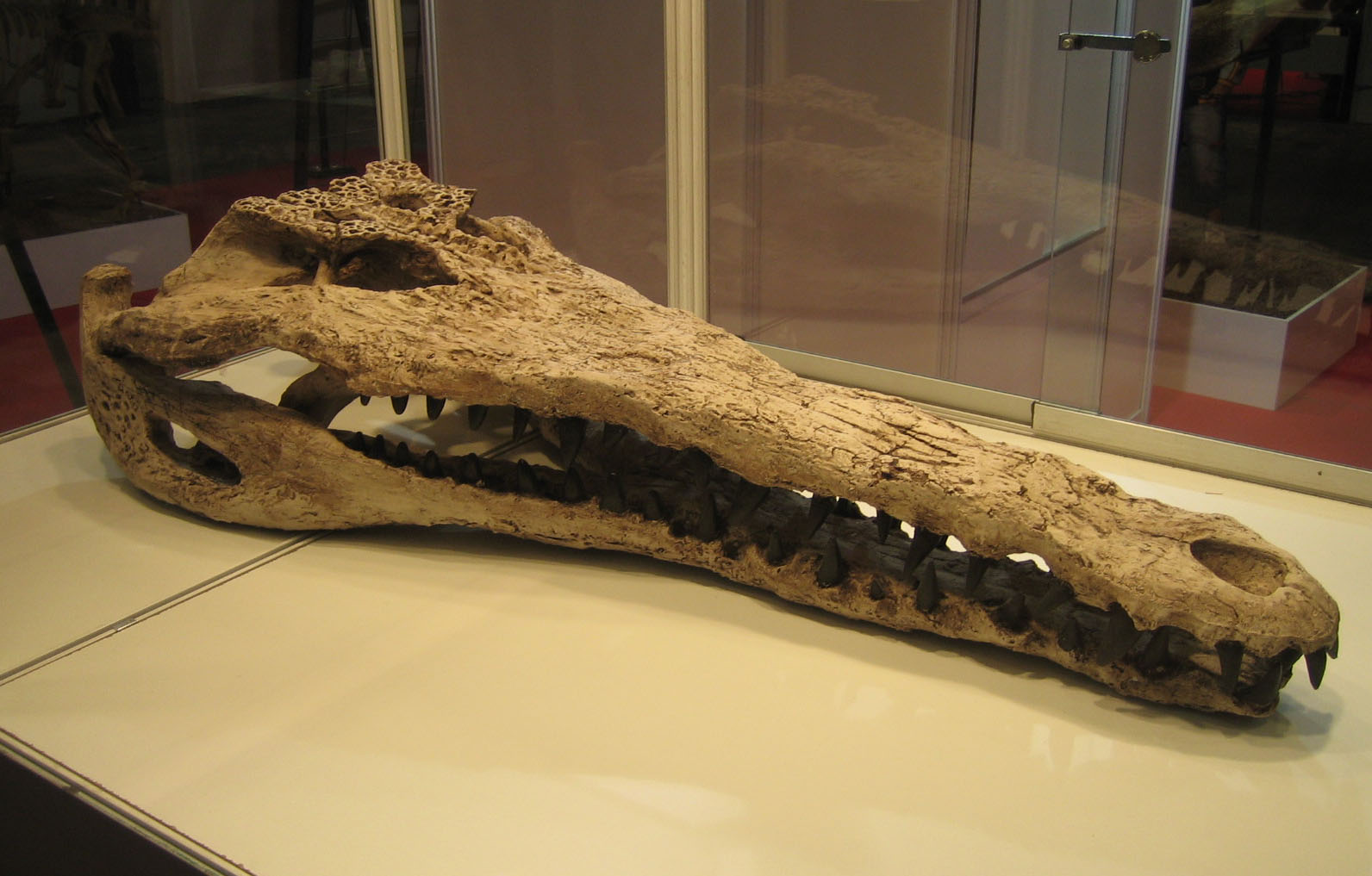
Large skull of T. antiquus, it measures 116.2cm (45.7 in) from the tip of the snout to the quadrate level.

In addition to reassigning G. americanus and G. carolinensis to Thecachampsa, Myrick combined all previously named species of Thecachampsa in a single species, with the oldest name being T. antiqua. The different tooth shapes that distinguished the species were considered variations in the dentition of a single species. However, the variation in dentition could only be seen in complete skulls, all of which had been referred to Gavialosuchus before the genus was synonymized with Thecachampsa.

Weems (2018) agreed with Piras et al. (2007) and Brochu & Storrs (2012) that Tomistoma americana and Gavialosuchus carolinensis belong to Thecachampsa rather than Gavialosuchus, and treated sericodon and antiquus as distinct species rather than one species, and suggested that the americanus holotype is conspecific with T. sericodon, making T. americana a synonym of T. sericodon.

== Palaeoecology ==
Paired δ^{18}O and δ^{13}C measurements suggest that T. americana primarily fed on marine prey, in contrast to sympatric Alligator that ate freshwater prey.
