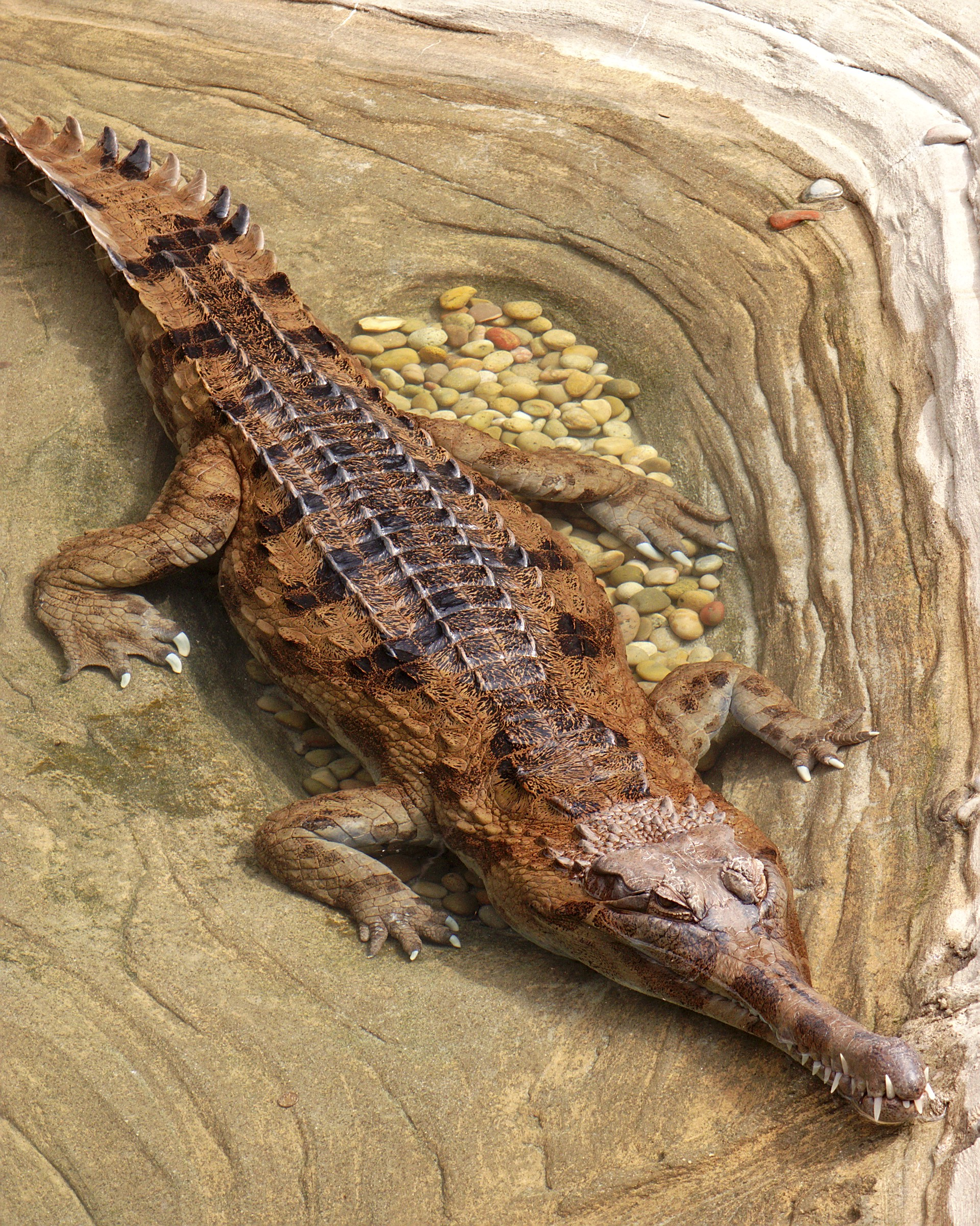
- False gharial (Tomistoma schlegelii)

Scientific classification
- Kingdom: Animalia
- Phylum: Chordata
- Class: Reptilia
- Order: Crocodylia
- Family: Gavialidae
- Subfamily: Tomistominae
- Genus: Tomistoma; S. Müller, 1846

Species
- Tomistoma schlegelii; †Tomistoma calaritanum; †Tomistoma coppensi; †Tomistoma gaudense; †Tomistoma lusitanicum

= Tomistoma =

Tomistoma Temporal range: Eocene - Recent, 47.8–0 Ma

Genus of crocodilians

Tomistoma is a genus of gavialid crocodilians. They are noted for their long narrow snouts used to catch fish, similar to the gharial. Tomistoma contains one extant (living) member, the false gharial (Tomistoma schlegelii), as well as potentially several extinct species: T. lusitanicum and T. coppensi. Previously assigned extinct species known from fossils are reclassified as different genera such as Herugavialis, Eogavialis, Toyotamaphimeia and Sutekhsuchus.

Unlike the gharial, the false gharial's snout broadens considerably towards the base and so is more similar to those of true crocodiles than the gharial, whose osteology indicated a distinct lineage from all other living crocodilians. However, although more morphologically similar to Crocodylidae based on skeletal features, recent molecular studies using DNA sequencing consistently indicate that the false gharial and by inference other related extinct forms traditionally viewed as belonging to the crocodylian subfamily Tomistominae actually belong to Gavialoidea and Gavialidae.

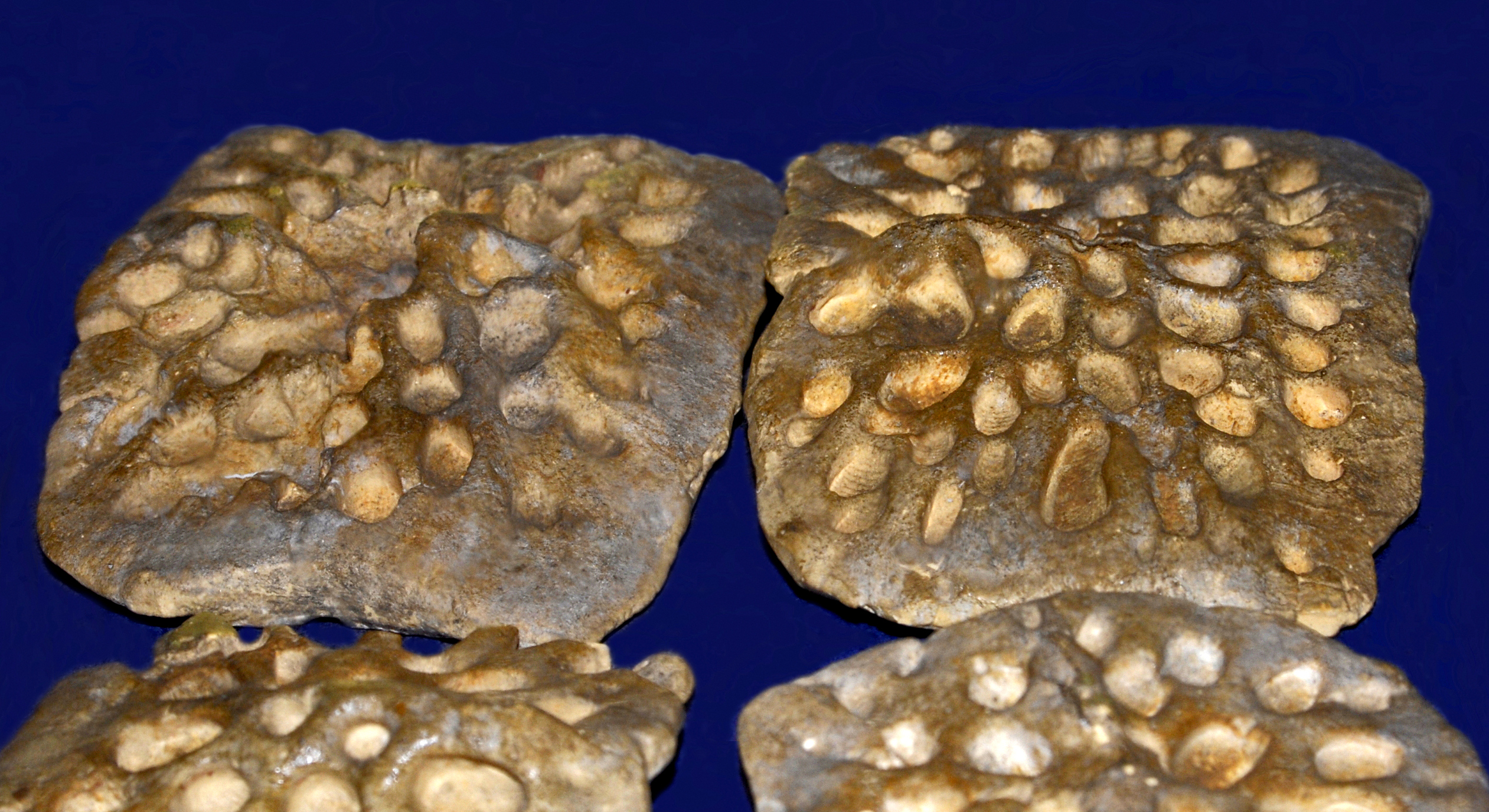
Fossil dorsal plates of "Tomistoma" calaritanum

Fossils of extinct Tomistoma species have been found in deposits of Paleogene, Neogene, and Quaternary ages in Uganda, Italy, Portugal, Egypt and India, but nearly all of them are likely to be distinct genera due to older age compared to the false gharial.

== Phylogeny ==
The cladogram below of the major living crocodile groups is based on molecular studies and shows the false gharial's close relationships:

- Crocodilia
  - Alligatoridae
    - Caimaninae
      - - Caiman
        - Melanosuchus
      - Paleosuchus
    - Alligatorinae
      Alligator
  - Longirostres
    - Crocodylidae
      - Crocodylus
      - - Mecistops
        - Osteolaemus
    - Gavialidae
      - Gavialis
      - Tomistoma

Here is a more detailed cladogram from a 2018 tip dating study by Lee & Yates simultaneously using morphological, molecular (DNA sequencing), and stratigraphic (fossil age) data that shows the false gharial's proposed placement within Gavialidae, including extinct members:

- Gavialoidea (stem-based group)
  - - - - Gavialidae (crown group)
          - - - - - - - - Gavialis gangeticus Gharial
                        - Gavialis bengawanicus†
                      - Gavialis browni†
                    - Gryposuchus colombianus†
                  - Ikanogavialis†
                - - Gryposuchus pachakamue†
                  - Piscogavialis†
              - Harpacochampsa†
            - - - Toyotamaphimeia†
                - Penghusuchus†
              - Gavialosuchus†
          - - Tomistoma lusitanicum†
            - Tomistoma schlegelii False gharial
        - Tomistoma cairense†
      - Dollosuchoides†
    - - Maroccosuchus†
      - Paratomistoma†
  - Kentisuchus†
