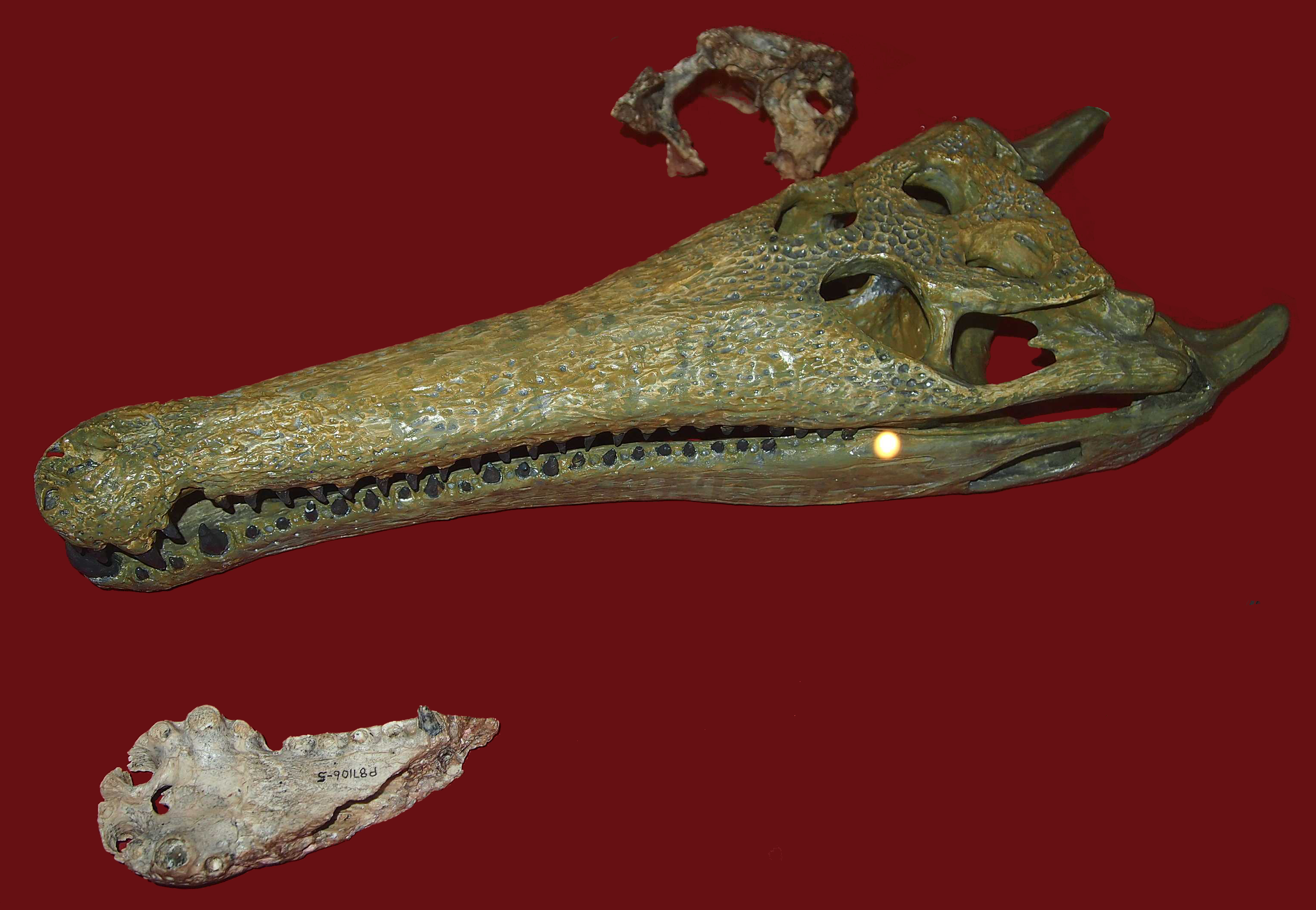
- skull

Scientific classification
- Kingdom: Animalia
- Phylum: Chordata
- Class: Reptilia
- Order: Crocodylia
- Superfamily: Gavialoidea
- Genus: †Harpacochampsa; Megirian, Murray & Willis 1991

Type species
- †Harpacochampsa camfieldensis Megirian, Murray & Willis 1991

= Harpacochampsa =

Harpacochampsa Temporal range: Early Miocene

Extinct genus of crocodilian

Harpacochampsa is a poorly known Early Miocene crocodilian from the Bullock Creek lagerstätte of the Northern Territory, Australia. The current specimen consists of a partial skull and fragments of a long, slender snout reminiscent of that of a false gharial, demonstrating that it was a piscivore in life.

It was originally tentatively placed within a group of Australian crocodilians now known as the Mekosuchinae, although this has been frequently disputed, with other authors instead suggesting it may have been a more basal crocodyloid or a type of gavialid.

== History and naming ==
Harpacochampsa was named on the basis of several bones, primarily of the skull, discovered at the Bullock Creek fossil site in the Northern Territory of Australia. The type description lists four specimens, the holotype being formed by the right side of the back of the skull, preserving both the infratemporal fenestra and the supratemporal fenestra. Additional fossils include the tip of the snout preserving most of the premaxillae, a piece of the mandible and two osteoderms.

The genus name is a combination of the Greek words "harpaco" (to seize) and "champsos" (crocodile), a nod to the anatomy of the premaxillary teeth and their inferred function. The species name meanwhile alludes to the Camfield Fossil Beds, of which Bullock Creek is a part.

== Description ==
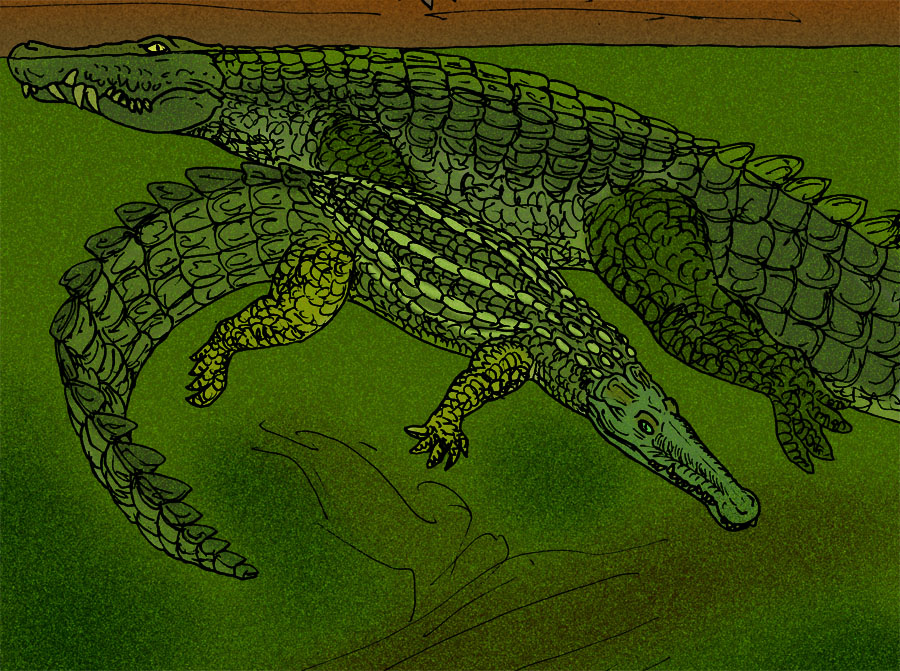
Harpacochampsa camfieldensis (front) and Baru darrowi (back)

The tip of the snout in Harpacochampsa is broadly similar to more slender-snouted species of Crocodylus, with the closest match in terms of robustness being the American crocodile. The sutures of the snout also most closely resemble this species, although the premaxillae are proportionally narrower. As a whole, the snout tip is relatively deep for its width, the cross-section resembling a flipped D towards the back of the preserved bone with a flat palate and sloping lateral edges. The premaxillae are roughly circular in shape and contain five teeth on each side, separated from the following maxillary teeth by a notch that presumably receives an enlarged dentary tooth, as in many other crocodilians. Notably, the only functional premaxillary tooth (the fifth) preserved in Harpacochampsa faces slightly outward rather than straight down. The size of the alveoli indicates that the premaxillary teeth differed greatly in size, making the crocodile pseudoheterodont, whereas the maxillary teeth are more uniform. Unlike in other crocodylids, in which the fifth maxillary tooth is the largest, in Harpacochampsa it is the fourth premaxillary tooth. The nares are slightly longer than wide and set far forward on the snout, almost entirely surrounded by the premaxillae except for a small area to which the nasal bones contribute. Just in front of the nares are two pits that receive the enlarged first dentary teeth, which equal the fourth premaxillary teeth in size. Besides them and the fourth dentary teeth, which are nested in the notch situated at the premaxillary-maxillary suture, none of the other teeth of the lower jaw appear to pass up the sides of the upper jaw.

The skull table of Harpacochampsa is broad and flat with large supratemporal fenestrae, overall resembling a less extreme version of what can be seen in the modern gharial. The size of the supratemporal fenestra is most similar to Gavialis lewisi. Several other characters of the skull table are generally similar to gharials as well, such as the relation between fenestra and the surrounding squamosals and parietal bones and the shape of the orbito-temporal artery. The frontal bone does not participate in forming the margins of the fenestra. The sides of the skull table are convex rather than straight or concave, another feature setting apart Harpacochampsa from modern Crocodylus species. Following the infratemporal fenestra, the jugal is long and slender and the postorbital bar robust, again features shared with gharials. The shape of the quadrate bone is difficult to determine, as the holotype specimen shows signs of having suffered from exostosis, the pathological formation of new bone. The sutures of the sides of the skull table fall into the range observed in extant species, and the exposure of the basisphenoid does not exceed the range of saltwater crocodiles either.

The two osteoderms known of Harpacochampsa are generally similar to those of the extant freshwater crocodile. The type description estimates that Harpacochampsa may have reached a length of up to 4 m (13 ft) based on the proportions of living crocodiles, possibly even as much as 5 m (16 ft).

== Taxonomy ==
Although many of Harpacochampsas gavialoid features were already recognized during the initial description, they were first thought to have been the result of convergent evolution. Instead, it was originally classified as a member of Crocodylidae. However, given the sparse material and uncertain internal relationships within Eusuchia, including the position of Tomistoma, the authors were hesitant to specify its exact placement with certainty. Two possible hypotheses were suggested, one placing Harpacochampsa closer to crocodylines and osteolaemines, while the other put forth a possible relationship to a monophyletic grouping of Cenozoic Australian crocodiles, named Mekosuchinae two years later.

However the taxon's inclusion within Mekosuchinae has since then been questioned by various authors and its exact position has become controversial. Works that conclude that Harpacochampsa was closest to true crocodiles of the subfamily Crocodylinae include papers published by Megirian, Salisbury and Willis, including the type description of Kambara implexidens. Another publication that recovered Harpacochampsa as neither being a mekosuchine nor a gavialoid is Ristevski et al. (2021). This paper described Gunggamarandu from the Pliocene to Pleistocene of Queensland as the first undisputed tomistomine of Australia. Although this confirms the presence of tomistines in Australia, Harpacochampsa itself was not found to be part of the group and instead recovered as one of the basalmost crocodyloids. Additionally, Ristevski and colleagues did not find tomistomines and gavialoids to form a clade with one another as some other analysis do.

- Crocodyloidea
  - Harpacochampsa camfieldensis
  - - - "Crocodylus" affinis
      - "Crocodylus" depressifrons
    - - Asiatosuchus germanicus
      - - - "Crocodylus" acer
          - Brachyuranochampsa eversolei
        - - Tomistominae
          - - "Crocodylus" megarhinus
            - - Mekosuchinae
              - - Osteolaeminae
                - - Mecistops
                  - Crocodylus

In 2001 Christopher Brochu argued against the work of Megirian et al. (1991) and Salisbury and Willis (1996), finding the taxon's placement within Mekosuchinae likely based on his own examinations of the material. Brochu did however note the unique morphology of Harpacochampsa, which at the time was the only known longirostrine genus in a family of species with either broad and flat or raised skulls. A second longirostrine mekosuchine would eventually be described in 2016 in the form of Ultrastenos, however phylogenetic analysis conducted at the time found that the inclusion of Harpacochampsa in the family does cause noise in the resulting phylogeny.

- - Mekosuchinae
    - Harpacochampsa camfieldensis
    - - - Trilophosuchus rackhami
        - Ultrastenos willisi
      - - Kambara murgonensis
        - - - Quinkana spp.
            - Australosuchus clarkae
          - - Volia athollandersoni
            - - Baru darrowi
              - Mekosuchus sanderi

Lastly, although the gavialoid affinities of Harpacochampsa have traditionally been dismissed, some research still suggest that the taxon is best placed within Gavialoidea alongside tomistomines as a basal grade within the clade. Below is a cladogram from a 2018 tip dating study by Lee & Yates simultaneously using morphological, molecular (DNA sequencing), and stratigraphic (fossil age) data that shows Harpacochampsa as a gavialid:

- Gavialidae
  - - Tomistoma lusitanicum
    - Tomistoma schlegelii (False gharial)
  - - - - Gavialosuchus
        - - Toyotamaphimeia
          - Penghusuchus
      - - Harpacochampsa
        - - - Gryposuchus pachakamue
            - Piscogavialis
          - - Ikanogavialis
            - - Gryposuchus colombianus
              - - Gavialis browni
                - - Gavialis gangeticus (Indian Gharial)
                  - Gavialis bengawanicus

== Paleobiology ==
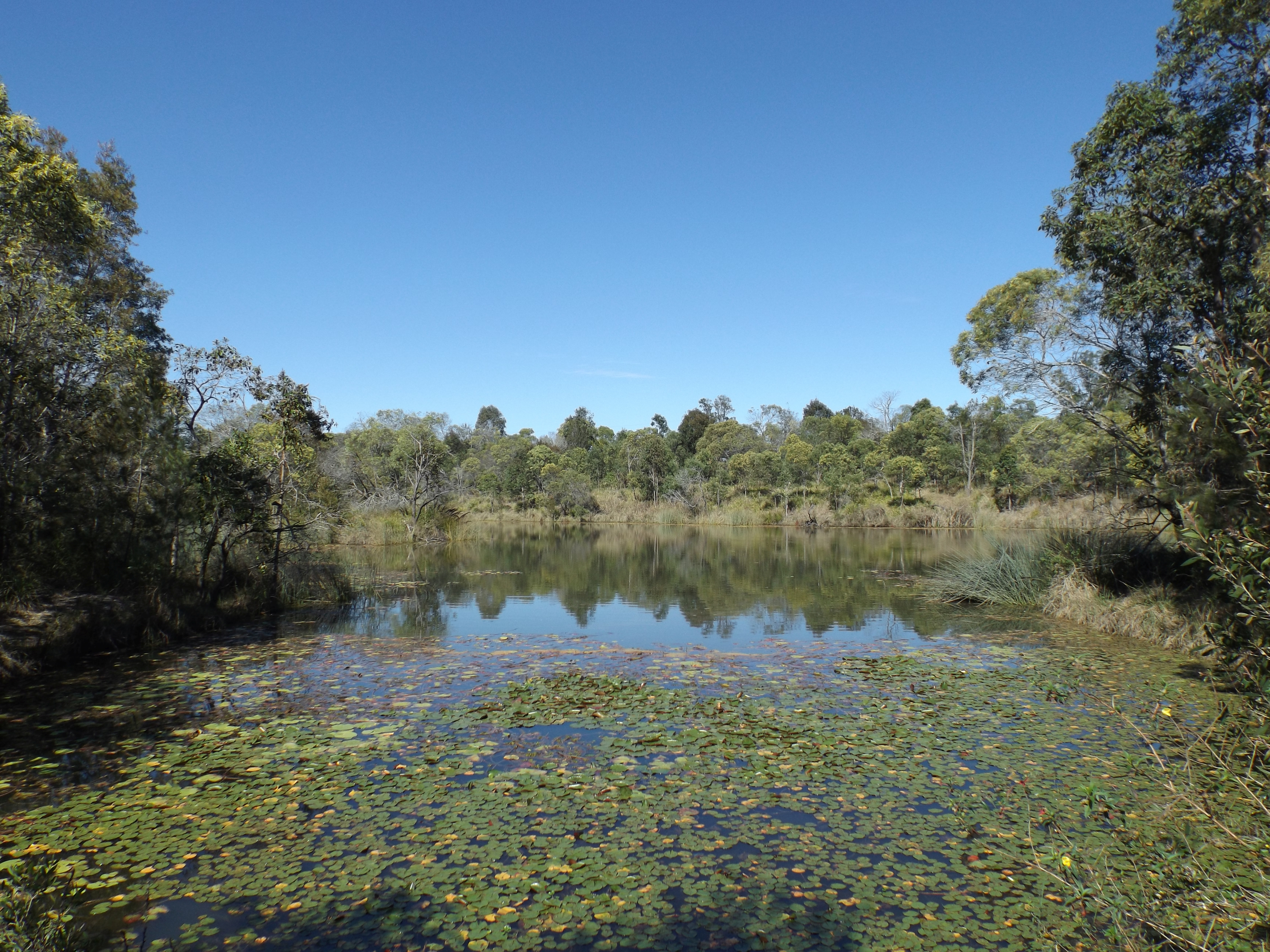
Harpacochampsa may have preferred deeper, slow moving waters like billabongs

The elongated snout of Harpacochampsa sets it apart clearly from the broad-snouted Baru darrowi. Unlike Baru, which inhabited the shallow streams of what is now Bullock Creek and hunted large mammals, Harpacochampsa was recovered from sediments that indicate that it inhabited slow moving waters such as billabongs and deep pools of water. Fossils recovered from these sediments confirm the presence of turtles, small fish and lungfish up to 80 cm (31 in) in length. Accordingly, it is thought that Harpacochampsa primarily fed on fish and possibly turtles, however given its relatively stout build compared to modern gharials, it is possible that it may have also taken medium-sized mammals as prey. If that is the case, Harpacochampsa would have likely relied on deeper water to weaken and drown them, while Baru could rely more on its own strength.
