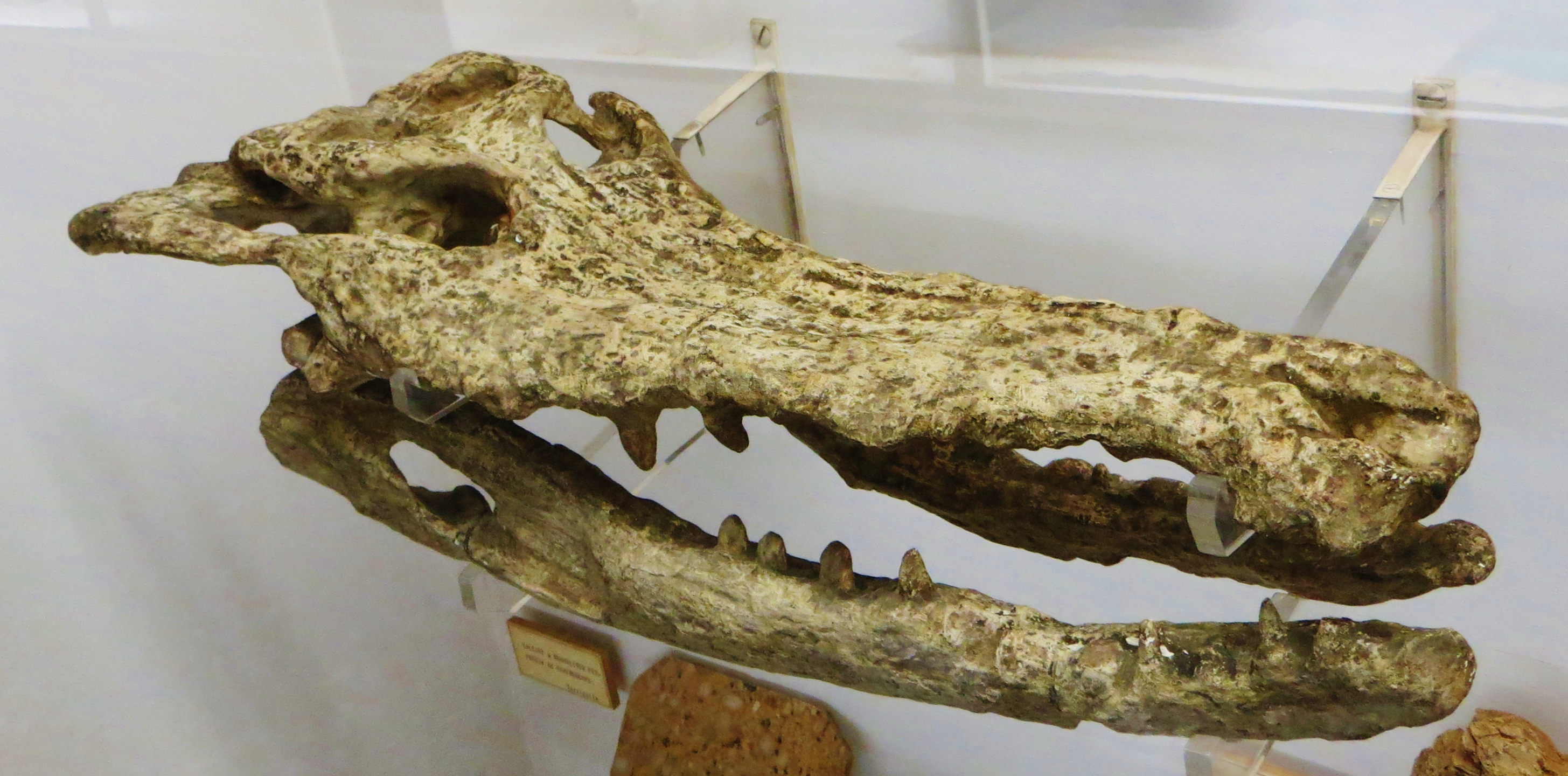

Scientific classification
- Domain: Eukaryota
- Kingdom: Animalia
- Phylum: Chordata
- Class: Reptilia
- Clade: Archosauromorpha
- Clade: Archosauriformes
- Order: Crocodilia
- Superfamily: Gavialoidea
- Genus: †Megadontosuchus; Mook, 1955

Species
- Megadontosuchus arduini (De Zigno, 1880) (type)

Synonyms
- Crocodilius arduini De Zigno, 1880

= Megadontosuchus =

Megadontosuchus Temporal range: Middle Eocene: Bartonian to Priabonian, ~41.2–33.9 Ma

Extinct genus of reptiles

Megadontosuchus is an extinct monospecific genus of gavialoid crocodylian, traditionally regarded as a member of Tomistominae, from the middle Eocene of Italy. Fossils have been found from Monte Duello in the province of Verona. The genus is currently monotypic, with the type and only species being Megadontosuchus arduini. The species was originally named in 1880, although it was assigned to the genus Crocodilius (now spelled Crocodylus). The genus was first erected by paleontologist Charles C. Mook in 1955 along with the genus Kentisuchus, which was also first classified as Crocodilius. No holotype for Megadontosuchus was designated in 1880, and a lectotype wasn't proposed until 2007.

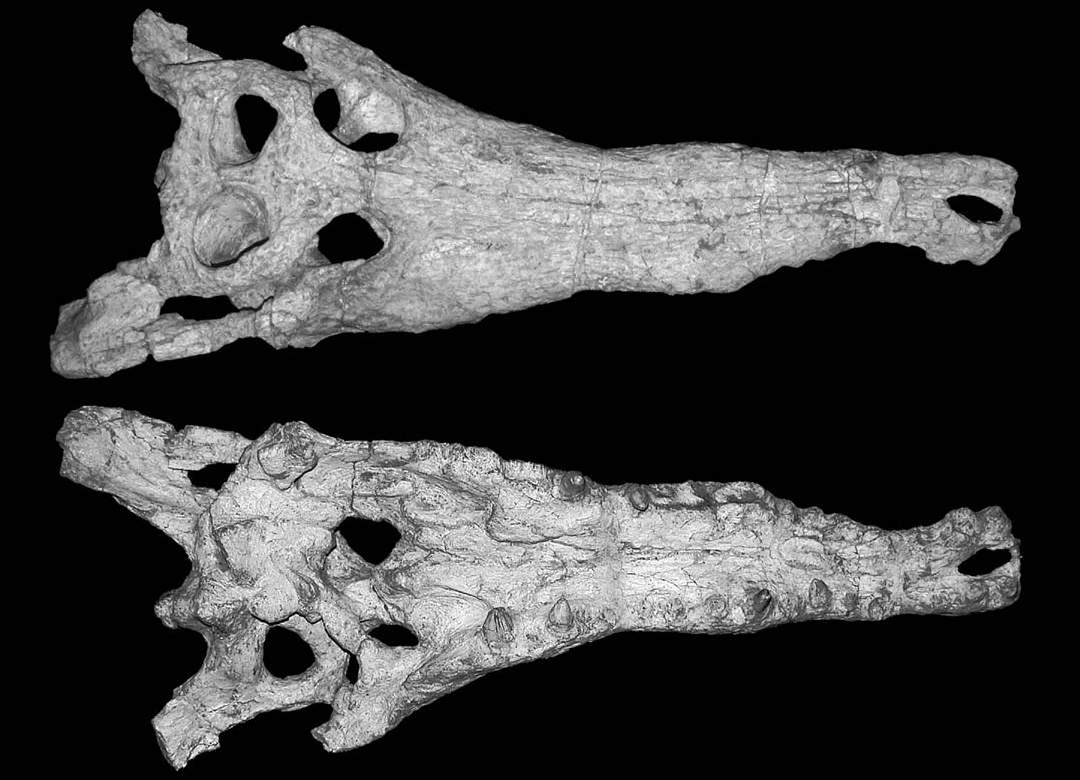
Skull seen from above and below

Megadontosuchus differs from other traditional "tomistomines" in that it has a more robust rostrum, very large teeth (hence the generic name meaning big-toothed crocodile), and large supratemporal fenestrae on the skull table.
