= Tip dating =

Tip dating is a technique used in molecular dating that allows the inference of time-calibrated phylogenetic trees. Its defining feature is that it uses the ages of the samples to provide time information for the analysis, in contrast with traditional 'node dating' methods that require age constraints to be applied to the internal nodes of the evolutionary tree.

In tip dating, morphological data and molecular data are typically analysed together to estimate the evolutionary relationships (tree topology) and the divergence times among lineages (node times); this approach is also known as 'total-evidence dating'. However, tip dating can also be used to analyse data sets that only comprise morphological characters or that only comprise molecular characters (e.g., data sets that include samples of ancient DNA or of serially sampled viruses).

Tip dating has been implemented in Bayesian phylogenetic software and typically draws on the fossilised birth-death model for evolution. This is a model of diversification that allows speciation, extinction, and sampling of fossil and extant taxa.

This promising method is not yet fully mature, and there are a number of possible biases or undesirable behaviour that must be taken into account when interpreting its results.
