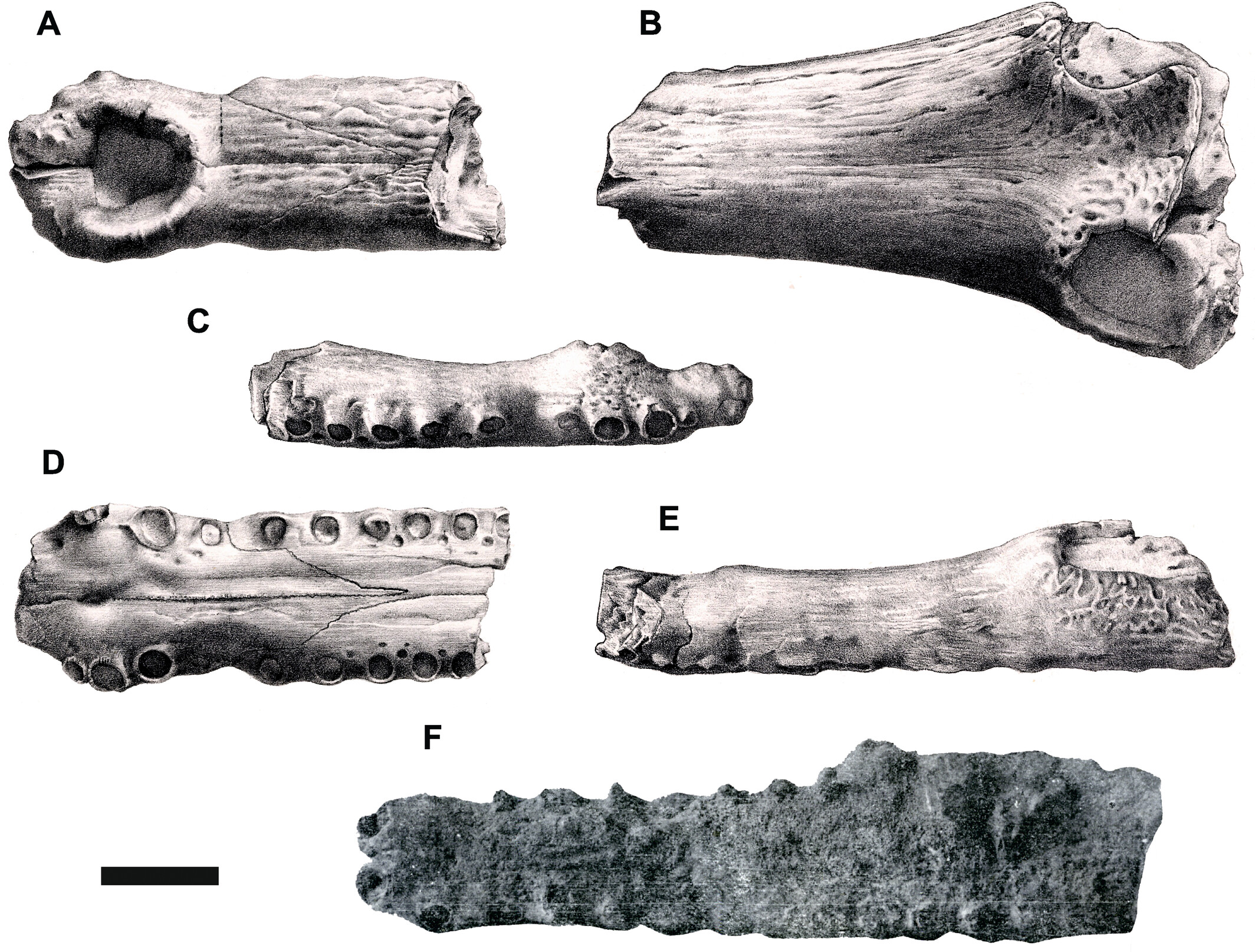
- The holotype skull of Pseudogavialis (A-E)

Scientific classification
- Kingdom: Animalia
- Phylum: Chordata
- Class: Reptilia
- Clade: Archosauria
- Order: Crocodilia
- Superfamily: Gavialoidea
- Genus: †Pseudogavialis; Courville et al., 2025
- Species: †P. curvirostris

Binomial name
- †Pseudogavialis curvirostris (Lydekker, 1886)

= Pseudogavialis =

Pseudogavialis Temporal range: Oligocene–Miocene

Genus of reptile

Pseudogavialis is an extinct genus of gavialoid from the Oligocene to Miocene Laki and Bugti Hills of Pakistan (probably the Chitarwata and Chinji Formations). Pseudogavialis was originally named by Richard Lydekker as "Gharialis" curvirostris in 1886, a misspelling of Gavialis, the genus that contains today's Indian gharial. Eventually it was recognized that the material belonged to a distinct genus, which was named Pseudogavialis in 2025. Like the closely related modern Indian gharial, Pseudogavialis had long and slender jaws with numerous interlocking teeth. It might have reached a length of up to 6–7 metres (20–23 ft).

== History and naming ==
Remains of fossil gavialoids have been known from Pakistan since around the late 19th century, with several being named as new species related to the modern gharial. Among these was "Gharialis" curvirostris, which was discovered during the early 19th century (no later than 1846) and was described by Richard Lydekker alongside "Gharialis" pachyrhynchus in 1886. "Gharialis" curvirostris was established on the basis of two pieces of the skull from the Laki Hills of Sindh, one preserving the very tip of the snout and the other the region just before the eyes, which clearly represent a single individual. Lydekker also describes additional skull remains, but unlike the holotype these weren't figured. In 1908 Guy Ellcock Pilgrim also reported to have found material of "G." curvirostris, reportedly from the Bugti Hills. While Pilgrim would eventually come to assign these fossils to their own taxon, "G." breviceps, the same 1912 paper to coin said name also makes mention of material from the Gaj of Kumbi, also located within the Bugti Hills. These three specimen were described as "Garialis" curvirostis var. gajensis in 1912, as Pilgrim believed them to represent a variant of Lydekker's species. The material that makes up "G." curvirostris" var. gajensis was also relatively complete, preserving almost the entire snout, elements of the posterior skull and even parts of the lower jaw. The next material attributed to this species was published in 2005 by Piras and Kotsakis, this time under the name "Gavialis" curvirostris. Both Richard Swann Lull and Piras & Kotsakis state that the material comes from the Chinji Formation. However Jeremy E. Martin later argued that the latter left it ambiguous whether or not they meant the Chinji Formation or simply a locality of the same name.

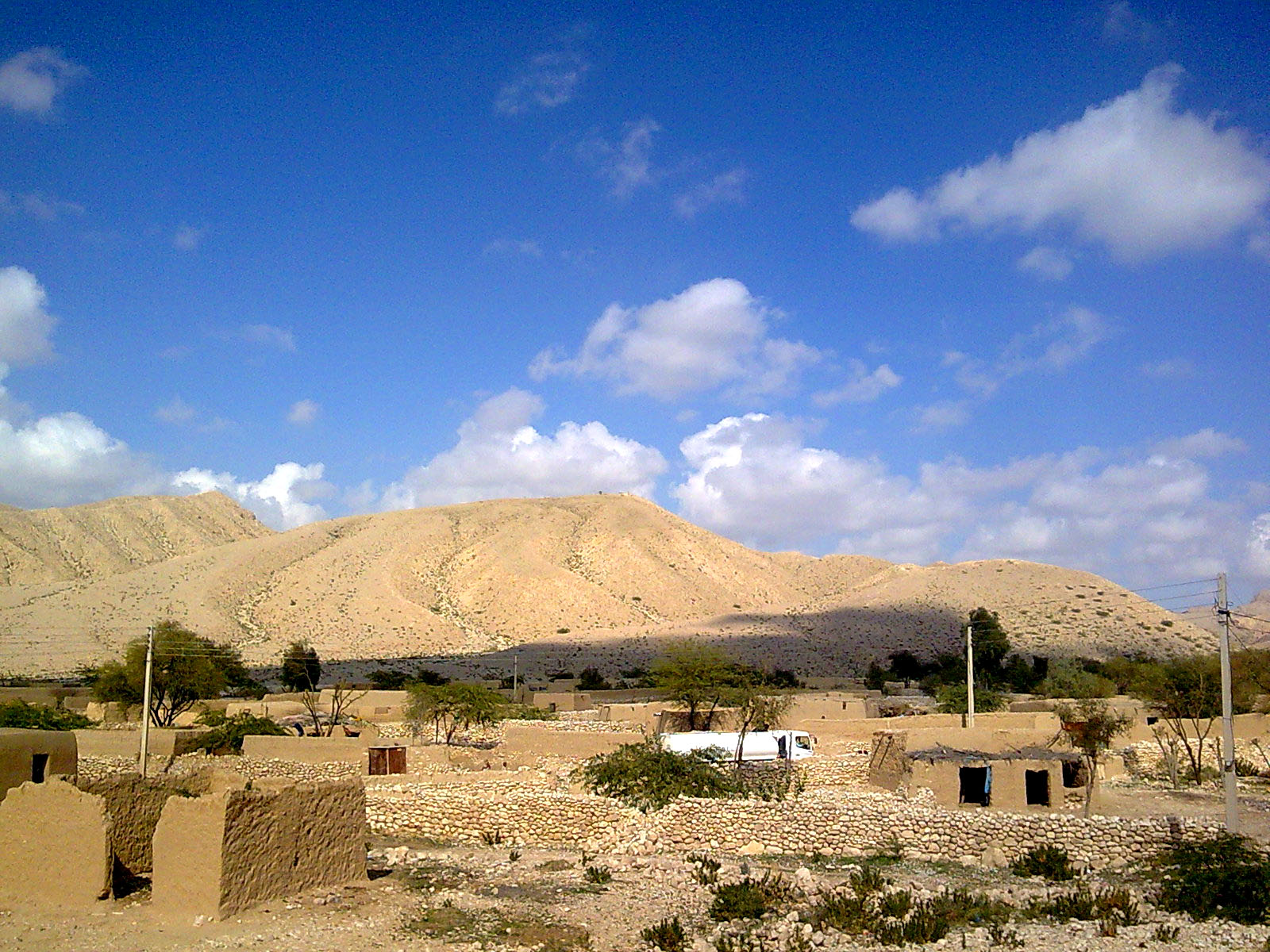
The Bugti Hills of Pakistan

With a plethora of species and specimen being present in literature, Jeremy E. Martin published a study reviewing these various forms in 2019. Martin suggests in this study that both "Gavialis" curvirostris and "Gavialis" curvirostris var. gajensis could very well be the same species. The paper furthermore hypothesizes that these forms could either be synonyms of Rhamphosuchus or that they are a new species of tomistomine. Regardless of the outcome, the paper is clear in the fact that the material does not belong to the modern genus Gavialis, with the same being the case for much of the material from Neogene Pakistan.

Another review and revision would eventually be published in 2025, authored by Erwan Courville and colleagues and dealing with the taxonomy of not only "Gavialis" curvirostris but also "Gavialis" pachyrhynchus, Gavialis breviceps and Rhamphosuchus crassidens. The study concludes that "Gavialis" curvirostris is distinct enough to be placed in its own genus, which the team names Pseudogavialis based on Lydekkers material. However, the case of Pilgrim's variant is more complex. Following the study, the mandible of "G." curvirostris var. gajensis does belong to Pseudogavialis, however, the rostrum described by Pilgrim appears to represent an intermediate between Pseudogavialis and "G." pachyrhynchus (dubbed Rhamphosuchus pachyrhynchus by the team) and is therefore tentatively identified as a new species of Rhamphosuchus. Pilgrim's posterior skull on the other hand cannot be assigned to any specific taxon beyond having belonged to a Crocodilian. In addition to reviewing already known material, Courville and colleagues also describe additional material collected during the 1990s from the Bugti Hills, specifically the Aquitanian Chitarwata Formation.

The name Pseudogavialis was chosen due to the animals broad resemblance to modern gharials, despite not being part of the genus as has been historically proposed.

== Description ==
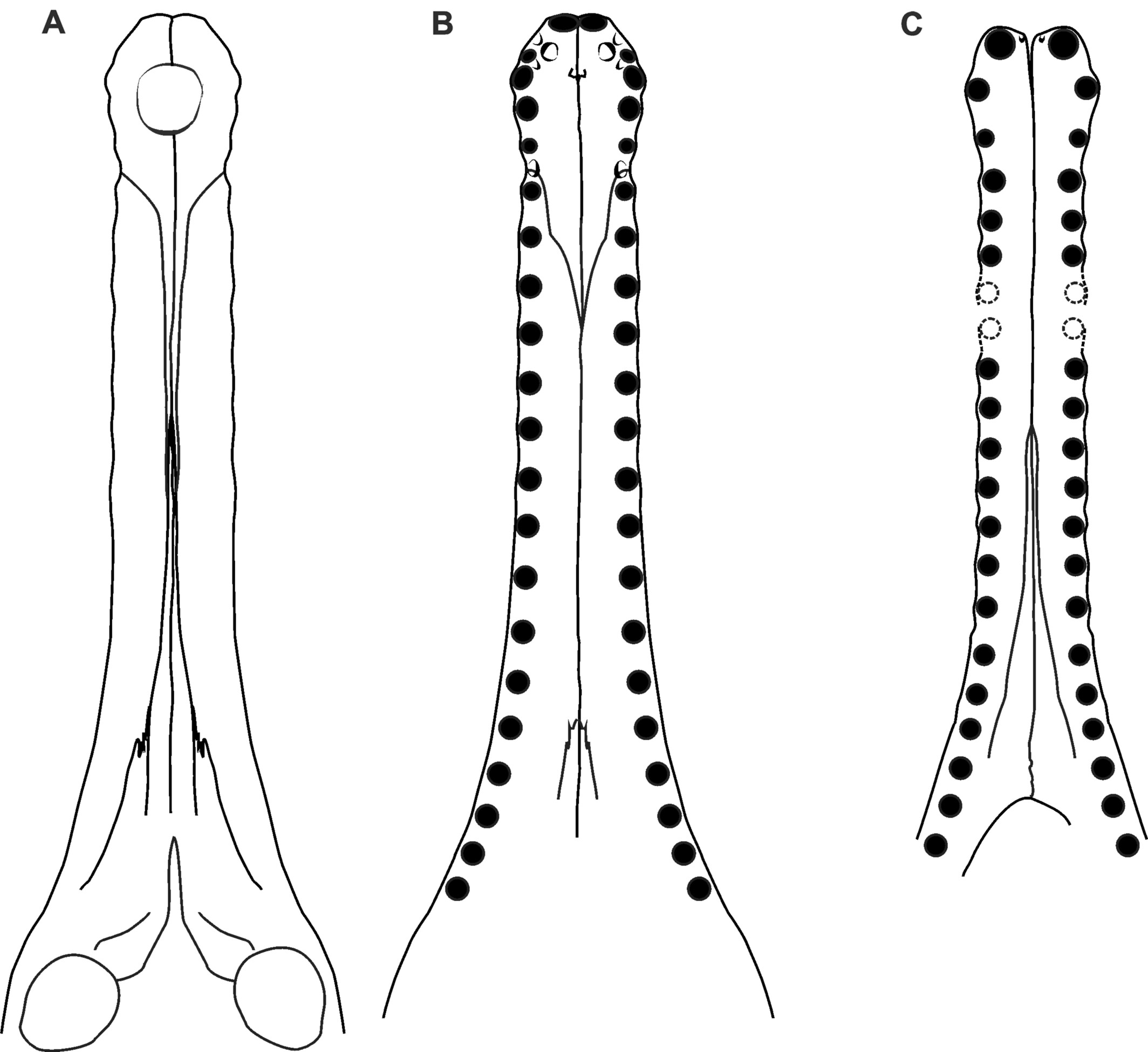
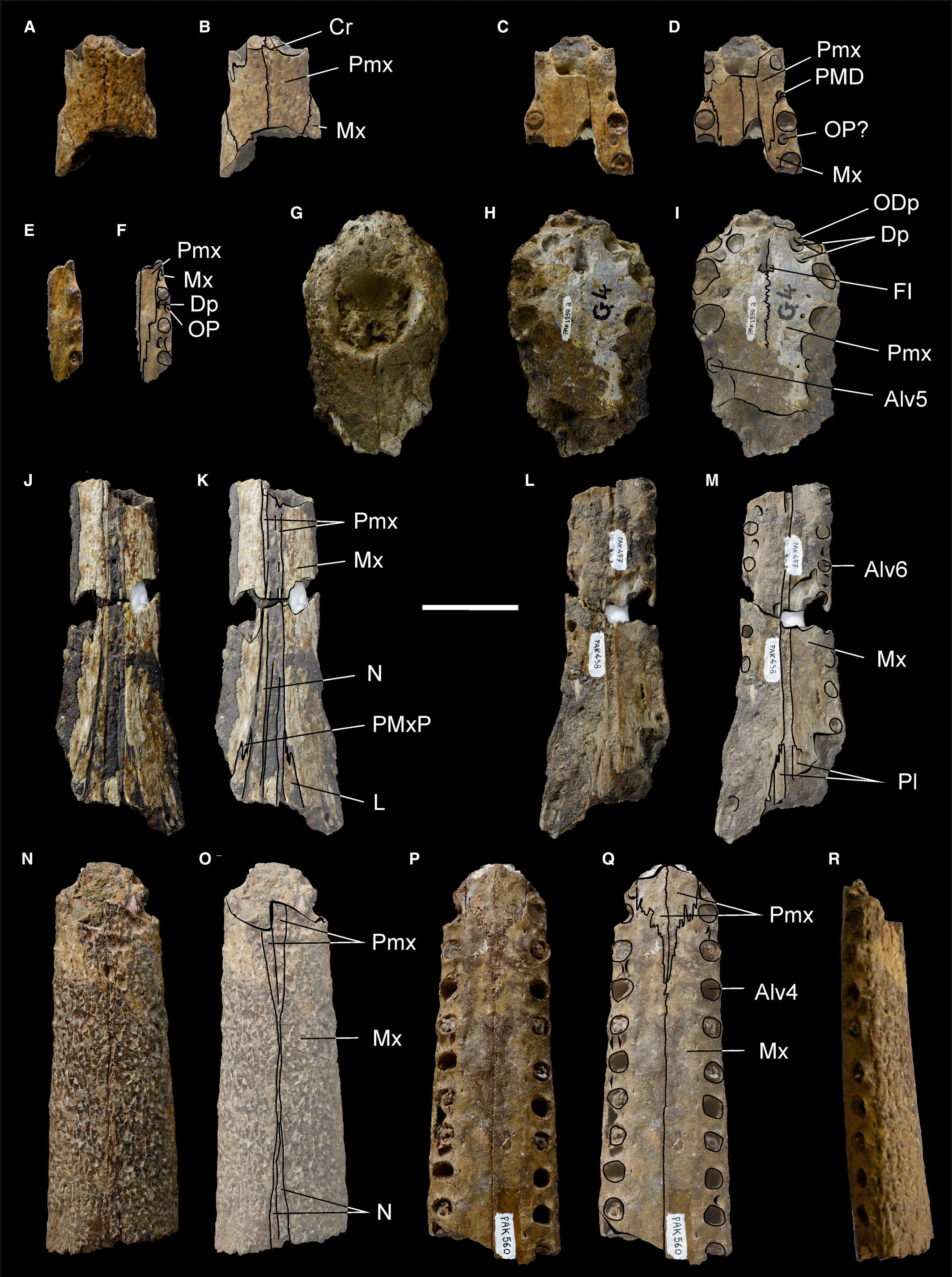
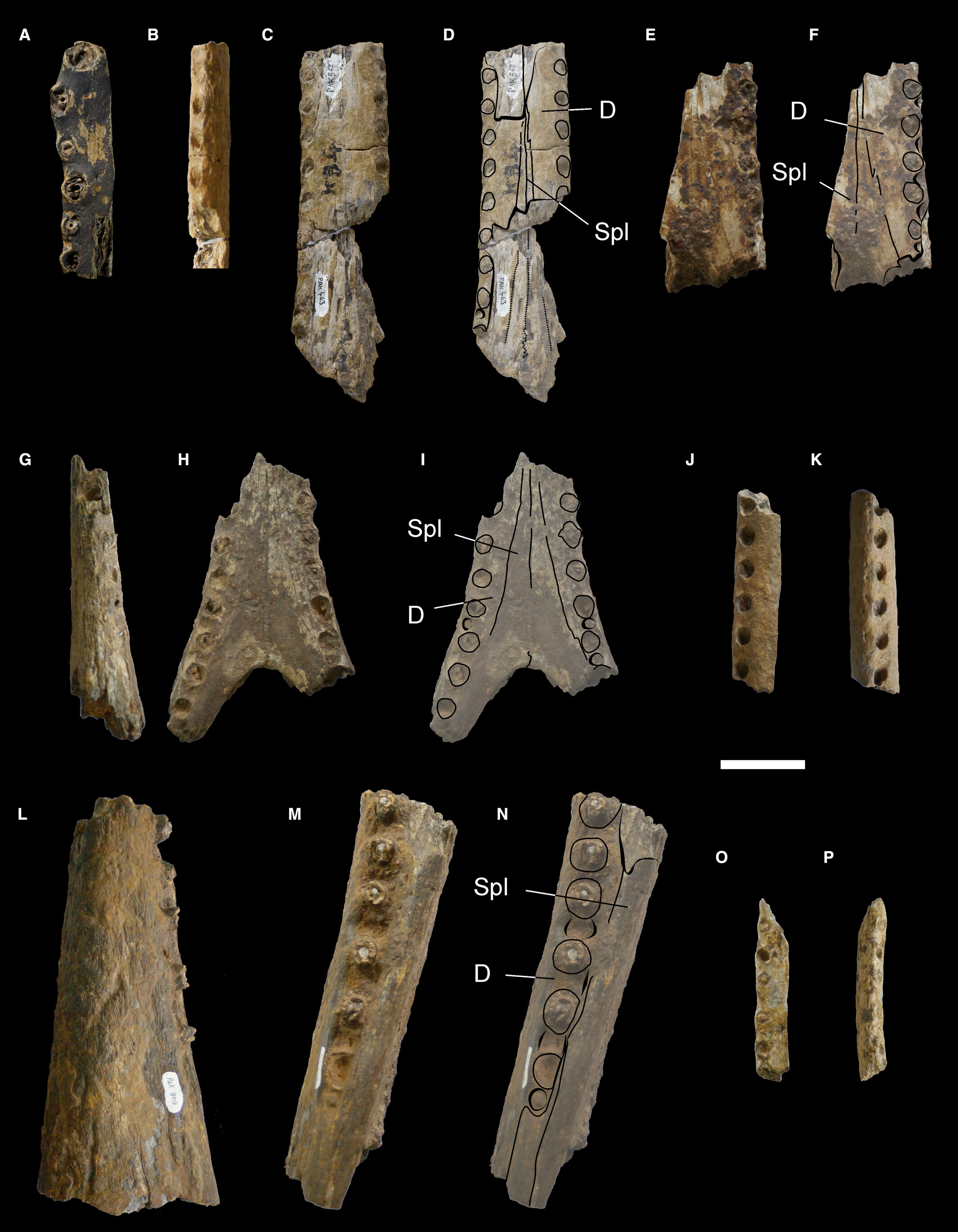
While the holotype of Pseudogavialis preserves much of the snout, allowing for a well informed reconstruction (top), most of the material is relatively fragmentary (bottom).

Pseudogavialis was a large crocodilian similar in size to today's Indian gharial, reaching lengths of around 6–7 metres (20–23 ft). It can easily be distinguished from the contemporary Rhamphosuchus pachyrhynchus and today's gharials by the shape and proportions of the premaxillae, which come together to form the tip of the snout. In Pseudogavialis, they are comparable in width to the elongated maxillae that form the majority of the rostrum, with outer edges that are described as rounded. By contrast, in modern gharials and in Rhamphosuchus pachyrhynchus the premaxillae are laterally expanded, meaning they widen in a way that gives the tip of the snout a much more distinct shape. However, the expansion of the premaxillae could be related to the presence of what is known as a ghara, a soft tissue structure present in adult male Indian gharials. Therefore, this might be a sexually dimorphic feature, with the expansion being present in males and absent in females. Aside from the fact that the premaxillae are not expanded, the fact that the premaxillary teeth of Pseudogavialis are much more widely spaced than those of Rhamphosuchus means that the premaxillae also appear much more elongated by comparison.

The large naris is entirely enclosed by the premaxillae and trapezoid in shape, another feature quite different from Rhamphosuchus which had a circular narial opening. The back of this opening is surrounded by a gentle ridge. Pseudogavialis appears to have lacked the depressions before and behind the nares that are seen in Rhamphosuchus crassidens and the Indian gharial, however, much like the expansion of the premaxillae this feature could tie into the presence or absence of a ghara and therefore differ between sexes. Behind the naris the two premaxillae contact each other along the midline of the skull, forming two highly elongated processes that extend as far back as the seventh maxillary teeth along a V-shaped contact with the maxillae to either side. Towards their posterior-most point, the premaxillary processes actually come into contact with the paired nasal bones. Similarly, the premaxillae contact the nasals in both the contemporary species of Rhamphosuchus and today's false gharial (Tomistoma), while the two bones don't touch each other in Rhamphosuchus crassidens and the modern Indian gharial.

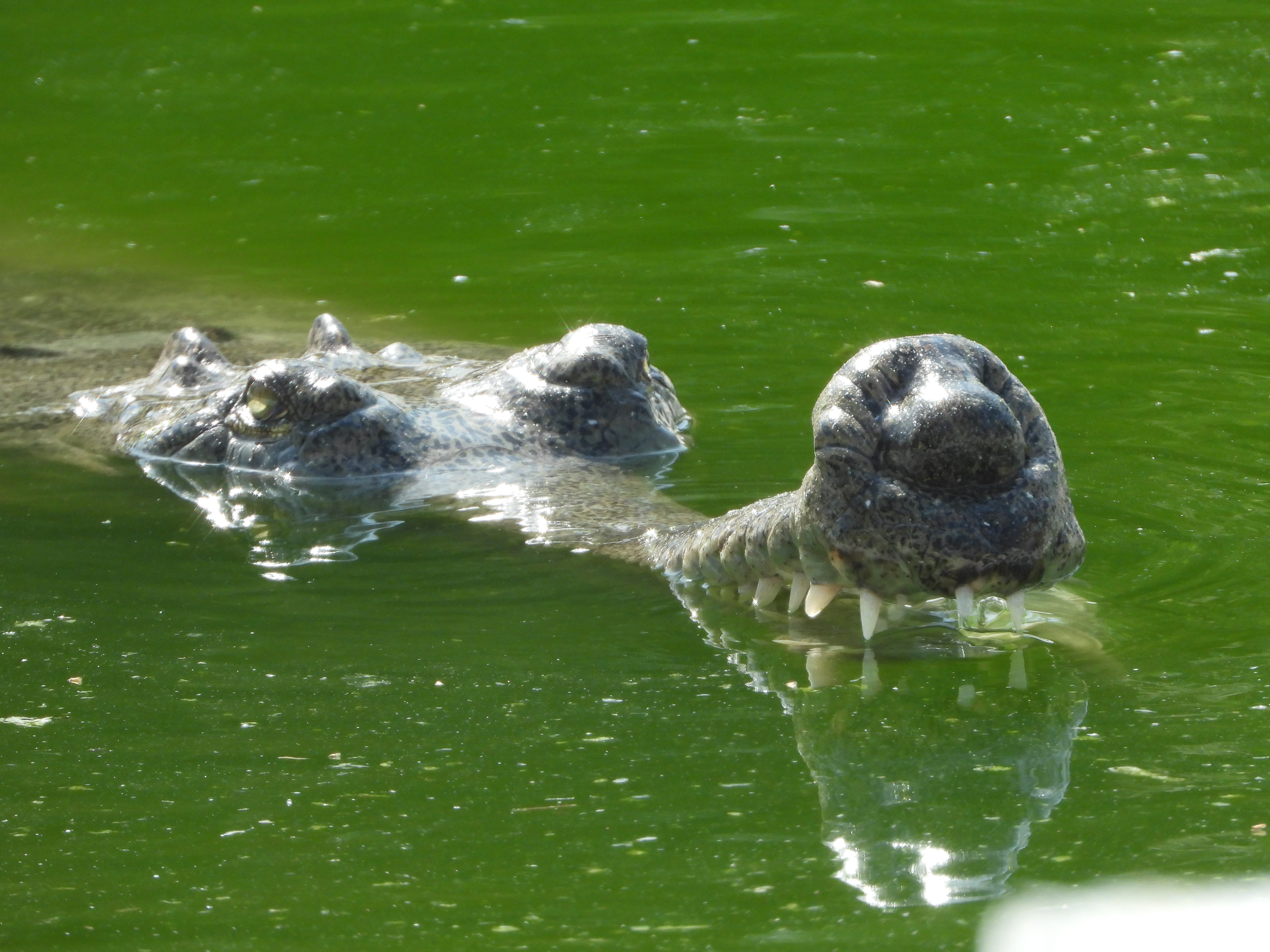
While the tip of the snout of Pseudogavialis is described as more slender than that of modern gharials, it is possible that collected material represents females that lacked a soft tissue ghara.

The remainder of the rostrum is mostly formed by the maxillae, which stretch from just behind the final premaxillary tooth all the way to the posterior part of the skull. As noted by Courville and colleagues, the outer edges of the maxillae run almost parallel to each other like in Indian gharials, which despite the fragmentary material indicates that the snout of Pseudogavialis was quite elongated.

Comparably little is preserved of the posterior region of the skull, with the holotype material just barely preserving parts of the eyesockets. However, based on this they appear to have been rounded with upturned edges, though they are not nearly as telescoped as in members of the genus Gavialis. The distance between the eyes is quite wide, wider than the diameter of a single orbit and approximately 86% of the snout width across the fourth maxillary tooth.

=== Dentition ===
Each premaxilla of Pseudogavialis features five dental alveoli or toothsockets of different sizes, with the second and fifth being the smallest. The third premaxillary tooth, which alongside the fourth is the biggest of the set, is positioned the furthest towards the outside (laterally) than the fourth, which in turn sits almost in a straight line with the fifth premaxillary tooth. This puts both of them parallel to the midline of the skull similar to what is seen in the false gharial, but in contrast to many other derived gavialoids including the Indian gharial. Behind the set of premaxillary teeth the snout constricts, leaving a toothless region that separates the premaxillary from the maxillary teeth. Despite this constriction in the rostrum, the first maxillary tooth sits in line with the previous two teeth of the premaxilla. Based on various different overlapping specimens, there seems to have been at least 16, possibly 17 maxillary teeth. Based on the alveoli preserved in the jaw, the teeth appear to have been uniform in size (homodont) and they are evenly spaced throughout the upper jaw, with each space approximately as long as the diameter of the alveoli. This generous spacing does help separate Pseudogavialis from large specimens of Rhamphosuchus, in which the alveoli are much more closely packed together.

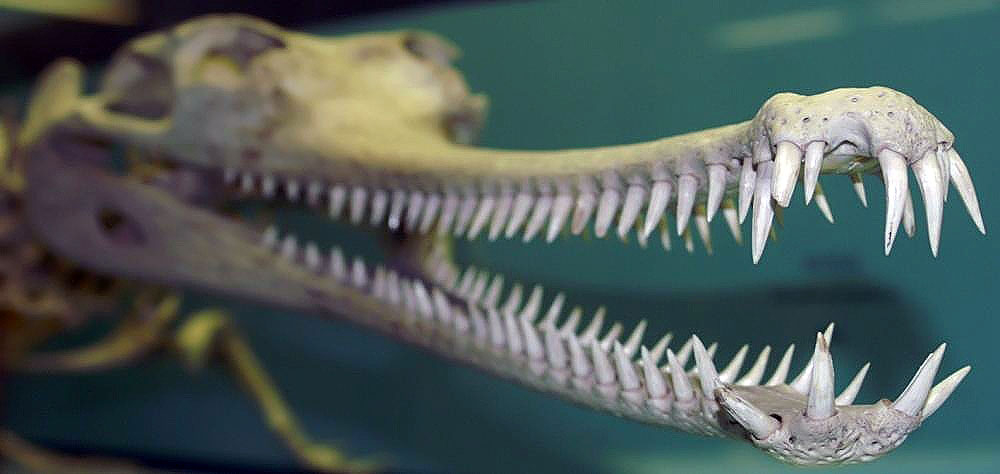
Like modern gharials, Pseudogavialis had fine, interlocking teeth.

Opposite of the approximately 22 teeth of the upper jaw would have been the dentary teeth, which can be separated into two broader regions. At least 19 dentary teeth would have been present on the mandibular symphysis, the fused anterior part of the lower jaw, and fossils of the posterior lower jaw suggest that the full count could have been upward of 25 dentary teeth. This means that Pseudogavialis not only had more dentary teeth along the symphysis than Rhamphosuchus, but also that the total toothcount was higher as well, again showcasing how it likely had longer jaws relatively to the larger gavialoid.

In addition to the gross number of teeth, the alveoli furthermore reveal aspects of how the teeth would have been positioned in the jaw. The third premaxillary alveolus for instance is described as facing anterolateroventrally, meaning that rather than primarily facing downward as in most other gavialoids, it is also somewhat directed towards the front and outward. The maxillary alveoli lack the anterior aspect, but still splay out in a prominently ventrolateral fashion, leaving the individual tooth sockets well visible when looking at the skull from the side. In addition to this, the individual alveoli have pronounced margins that elevate the teeth above the palate. In accordance with the teeth of the upper jaw, those of the dentary are oriented anterolaterodorsally, meaning they likewise splay somewhat out but have a more forward-facing aspect to them that is not described for the maxillary teeth.

Finally, the presence of occlusal pits shows that the teeth would have interlocked just like in modern gharials. Such pits are clearly visible between the first two premaxillary teeth and between the posterior dentary teeth. Occlusal pits can also be seen between the maxillary teeth, though in this case they are noted to be less numerous and very small, which suggests that the interlocking dentary teeth would have likely been rather finer than in Rhamphosuchus.

== Phylogeny ==
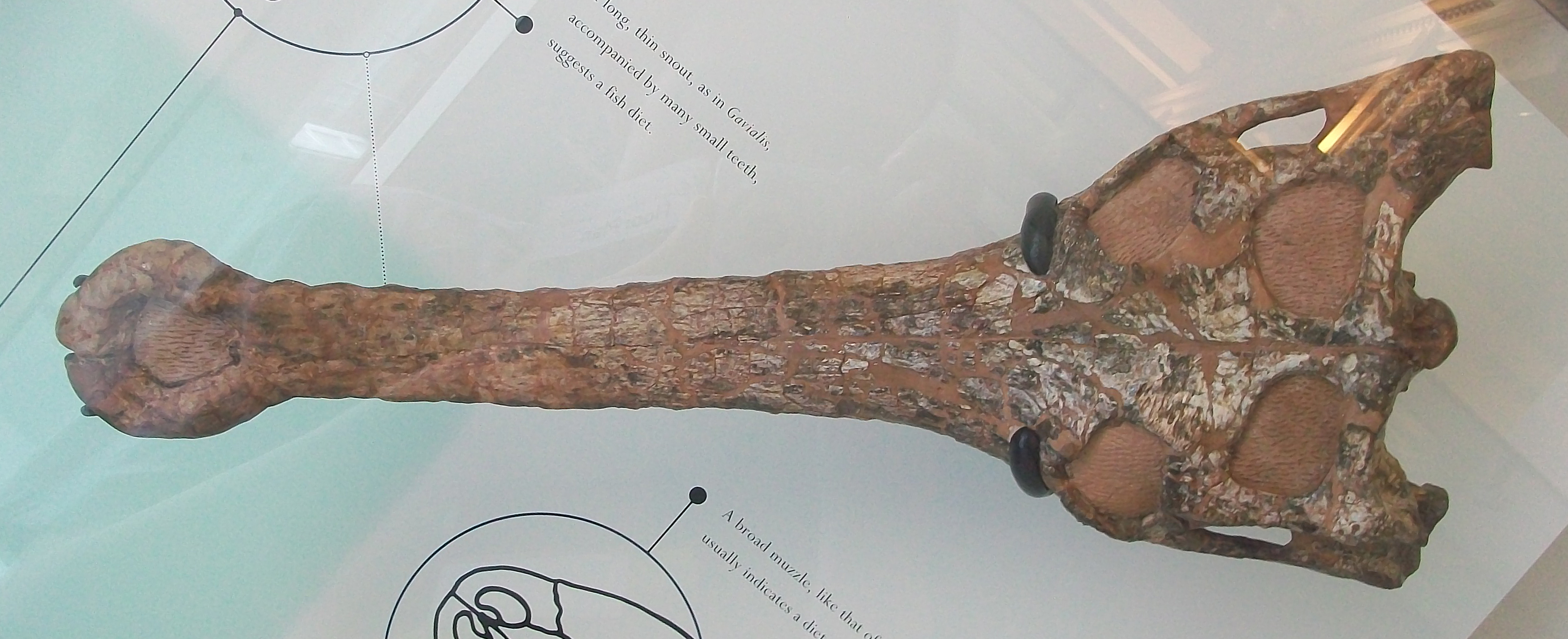
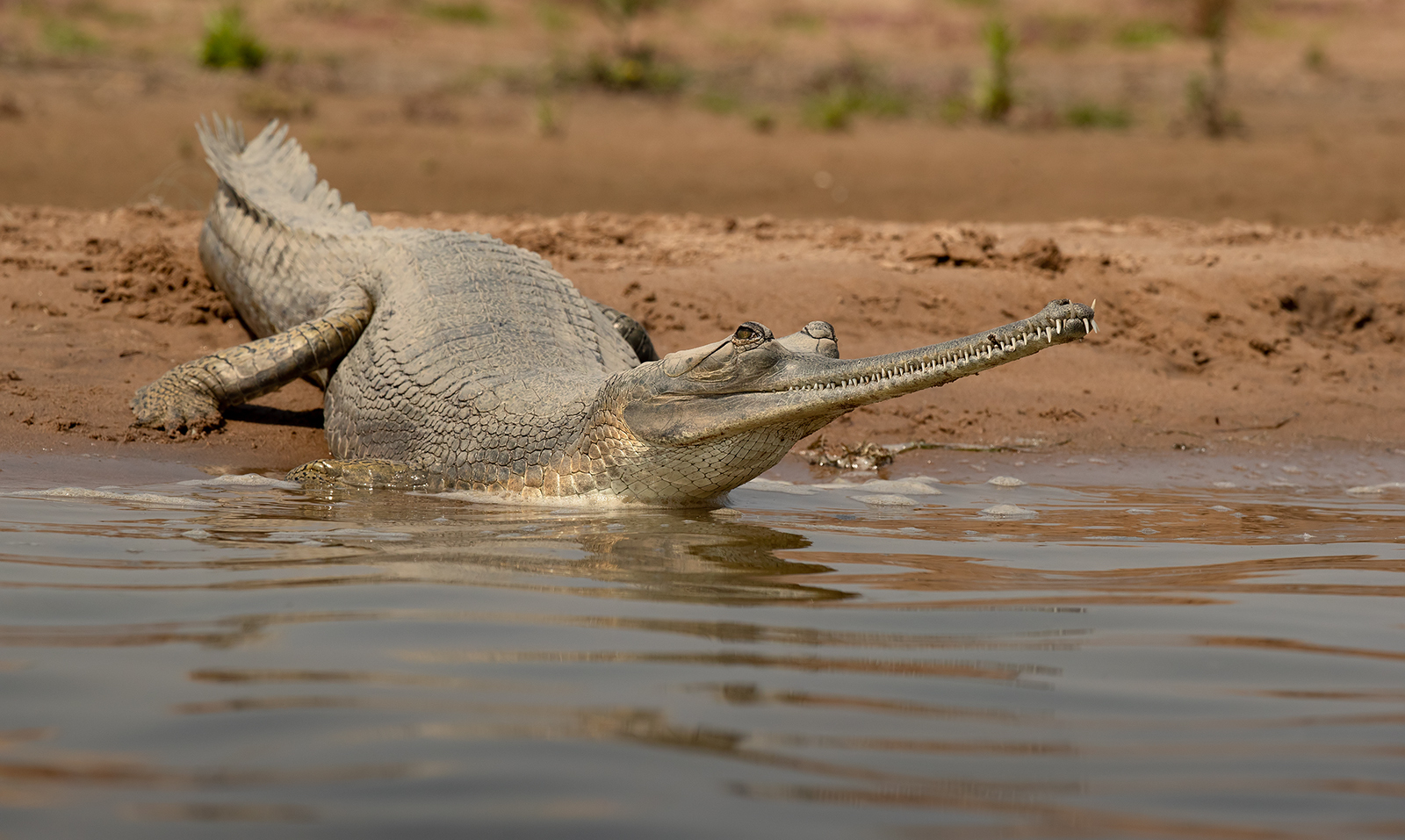
Phylogenetic analysis consistently recover Pseudogavialis as a close relative of the genus Gavialis, which includes fossil species as well as the modern Indian gharial.

Several analyses were conducted to find how Pseudogavialis was related to other fossil gavialoids. A consistent issue highlighted by the authors however concerns the often-contradictory implications of the resulting phylogenetic trees. Several trees for instance recover a topology matching the morphology-based of gavialines and tomistomines being only distantly related, with the former basal crocodilians and the latter crocodyloids, which is inconsistent with molecular studies. Some other trees meanwhile are consistent with molecular results, but the inclusion of thoracosaurs within Gavialoidea does not match the fact that most molecular studies find that tomistomines and gavialines diverged in the Oligocene to Miocene. To this comes that many of the trees differ significantly in topology and resolution simply on the basis of specific taxa being excluded.

Despite the fact that the relationship between tomistomines and gavialines is inconsistent between the various analyses, the position of Pseudogavialis was very consistent. All analyses recover Pseudogavialis as a close relative of today's Indian gharial and the fossil species Gavialis browni. While this close relationship could be used as a reason to include Pseudogavialis within Gavialis, Courville and colleagues argue that the clear morphological differences like the telescoped eyes of the latter clearly separate one genus from the other.

The two phylogenetic trees show the relationship of Pseudogavialis with other gavialoids both in a topology excluding tomistomines from Gavialoidea and including tomistomines as early members of the group.

- - Gavialoidea
    - †Eosuchus
    - - †Ocepesuchus
      - †Thoracosaurinae
      - - - †Aktiogavialis
          - †Argochampsa
        - - - †cf. Rhamphosuchus sp.
            - - †Rhamphosuchus pachyrhynchus
              - †Rhamphosuchus crassidens
          - - †Eogavialis
            - - †Gryposuchinae
              - - †Pseudogavialis curvirostris
                - - †Gavialis browni
                  - Gavialis gangeticus (Indian gharial)

- - Gavialoidea
    - †Maroccosuchus
    - - - †Kentisuchus astrei
        - †Megadontosuchus arduini
        - †Kentisuchus spenceri
      - - †Melitosaurus
        - †"Tomistoma" coppensi
        - †Paratomistoma courti
        - †"Tomistoma" cairense
        - Tomistoma schlegelii (false gharial)
        - - †"Tomistoma" gaudense
          - †"Tomistoma" calaritanum
        - Maomingosuchus
        - Thecachampsa
        - - †Gavialosuchus
          - †"Tomistoma" lusitanica
        - - †Penghusuchus
          - - - †Toyotamaphimeia
              - †Hanyusuchus
            - - †Eosuchus
              - - †Ocepesuchus
                - - †Eothoracosaurus
                  - †Thoracosaurus
                - - - †Aktiogavialis
                    - †Argochampsa
                  - - †Eogavialis
                    - - †Gryposuchinae
                      - - †Pseudogavialis curvirostris
                        - - †Gavialis browni
                          - Gavialis gangeticus (Indian gharial)

== Paleobiology ==
Pseudogavialis lived during the late Oligocene and early Miocene in what are now the Laki and Bugti Hills of Pakistan, corresponding to the Chitarwata Formation. During this time period, the region was dominated by an extensive river system and river delta within a vast floodplain formed by the "Proto-Indus", which drained from the early Himalayan foothills. During the same time period, these waterways were also inhabited by Rhamphosuchus pachyrhynchus, a slightly larger and noticeably more robust gavialoid that likely filled a different nische. Another large crocodilian from these strata was Astorgosuchus, which had a skull much more similar to modern crocodiles rather than the more elongated jaws of Pseudogavialis and Rhamphosuchus.
