= Bugti Hills =

Hills in Pakistan

Bugti Hills are a range of hills in eastern Balochistan, Pakistan. It includes the tribal tract called Bugti country. It is known for its fossils.

In 2001, a thirty-million-year-old Oligocene-aged fossil tooth from the Bugti Hills of central Pakistan was identified as from a lemur-like primate, prompting controversial suggestions that the lemurs may have originated in Asia.

== Palaeobiology ==
In addition to the potential lemur like primate the Bugti hills preserve the bones of a rich community of animals dating to the Oligocene and Miocene epochs through the Chitarwata Formation, which include the giraffid Bugtimeryx, abundant perissodactyl (odd-toed ungulate) remains, with chalicotheres being among the rarer members of the ecosystem. Rhinocerotoids are much more common and diverse, constituting the most abundantly present group of large mammals from the region. The group is represented by amynodontids, the enormous paraceratheriid Paraceratherium, crown rhinocerotines, elasmotheriines, and aceratheriines. Even early proboscideans were found within the Bugti hills, eventually leading to the replacement of paraceratheriids with deinotheres during the Oligocene-Miocene faunal turnover. Rodents, Primates, an indeterminate Creodont and an indeterminate species of the Entelodont Paraentelodon have also been recovered from the hills. Crocodylians were also present with three genera being found in the hills, with the gavialoids Rhamphosuchus pachyrhynchus and Pseudogavialis and the crocodylian Astorgosuchus. Sharks such as Cretalamna, Carcharhinus, Hemipristis and Nebrius were also present.

== See also ==
- List of fossil sites (with link directory)
- Timeline of evolution
- Timeline of human evolution
