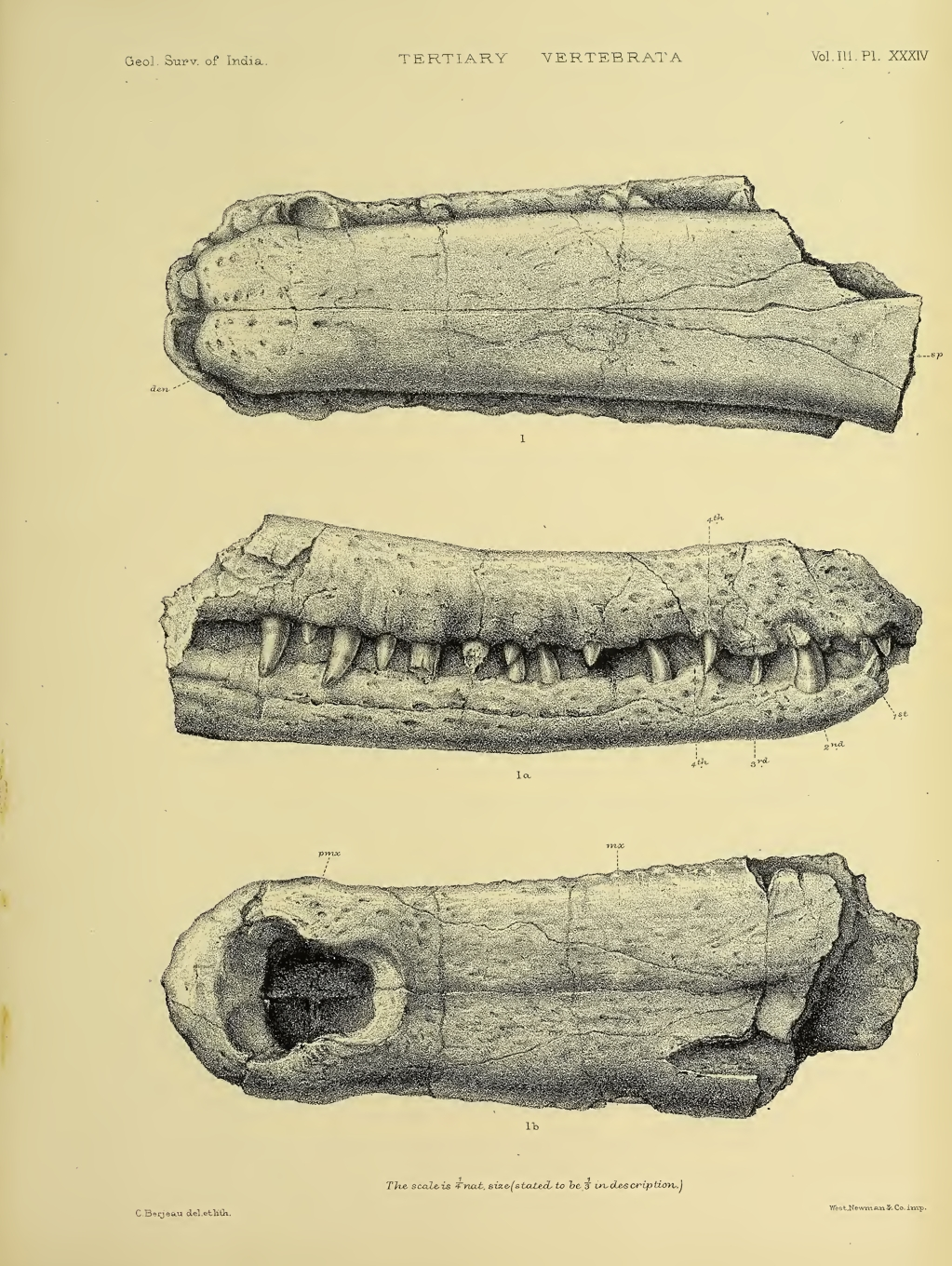
- The holotype of Rhamphosuchus crassidens; the tip of the rostrum or snout: NHMUK PV OR 39802.

Scientific classification
- Kingdom: Animalia
- Phylum: Chordata
- Class: Reptilia
- Order: Crocodylia
- Superfamily: Gavialoidea
- Genus: †Rhamphosuchus; Lydekker, 1886

Type species
- †Leptorhynchus crassidens Falconer & Cautley, 1840

Species
- †R. crassidens (Falconer & Cautley, 1840); †R. pachyrhynchus (Lydekker, 1886)

Synonyms
- R. crassidens; †Crocodylus (Leptorhynchus) crassidens Falconer & Cautley, 1840; †Leptorhynchus crassidens Falconer & Cautley, 1840; †Gavialis breviceps? Pilgrim, 1912; †Gavialis curvirostris var. gajensis? Pilgrim, 1912; R. pachyrhynchus; †Gharialis pachyrhynchus Lydekker, 1880; †Gavialis pachyrhynchus Lydekker, 1880

= Rhamphosuchus =

Rhamphosuchus Temporal range: Oligocene to Pliocene Possibly Early Middle Pleistocene

Extinct genus of reptiles

Rhamphosuchus is a genus of extinct gavialoid crocodylians from the Indian subcontinent. Two species are currently recognized, the geologically older R. pachyrhynchus, represented by fossils recovered in Oligocene and Miocene deposits of Pakistan's Bugti and Laki Hills and possibly Khari Nadi Formation of Kutch, and the younger R. crassidens, known from the Plio-Pleistocene of Siwalik Hills of Northern India. Additional remains are also known from the Pliocene of Nepal and a tentative third species was recovered in Pakistan. Both species are known for their great size, with rigorous estimates showing potential body lengths ranging from 8 to 11 m (26 to 36 ft) based on all known specimens for R. crassidens to a 2025 estimate for R. pachyrhynchus around 6 to 8 m (20 to 26 ft).

Both Rhamphosuchus species were historically considered part of the genus Gavialis, though detailed study revealed that their morphology differs significantly from that genus, which is represented by the extant gharial. Compared to the gharial, species of Rhamphosuchus are noticeably more robust, with snouts that gradually widen towards the back of the head, along with teeth that vary in size, are closely spaced, and form an "overbite" similar to that of modern alligators rather than the interlocking teeth of other gavialoids. Rhamphosuchus skulls bear prominent depressions around the bony naris that bears a close resemblance to the naris of male gharial skulls, which may indicate the presence of a knob-like soft tissue structure known as a ghara. The two named species are best differentiated by the shape of their snout tips, as that of R. crassidens is around the same height and width as the rest of the snout, while that of R. pachyrhynchus is prominently expanded both to the sides and upwards.

The robust build and great size of Rhamphosuchus have been taken as indicators that in life, the animal had a more generalist diet compared to the modern, mostly fish-eating gharial. Its prey may have included chalicotheres and rhinos, which may even have included juvenile Paraceratherium; these ungulates are known from the same geological formations as Rhamphosuchus, and some of their fossils bear the bitemarks of a large-bodied species of crocodilian. However, Rhamphosuchus shared its environment with multiple large-bodied crocodilians, so the bitemarks are of ambiguous origin. Whatever the case, Rhamphosuchus inhabited the highly productive river systems that once spanned across the subcontinent, which persisted for millions of years through major shifts in climate that had an ecological transition from forested biomes to more open grassland environments. The productivity of the ecosystem, warm temperatures, and geographically extensive wetlands of the time may have been key factors in allowing this animal to grow as large as it did.

== History and naming ==
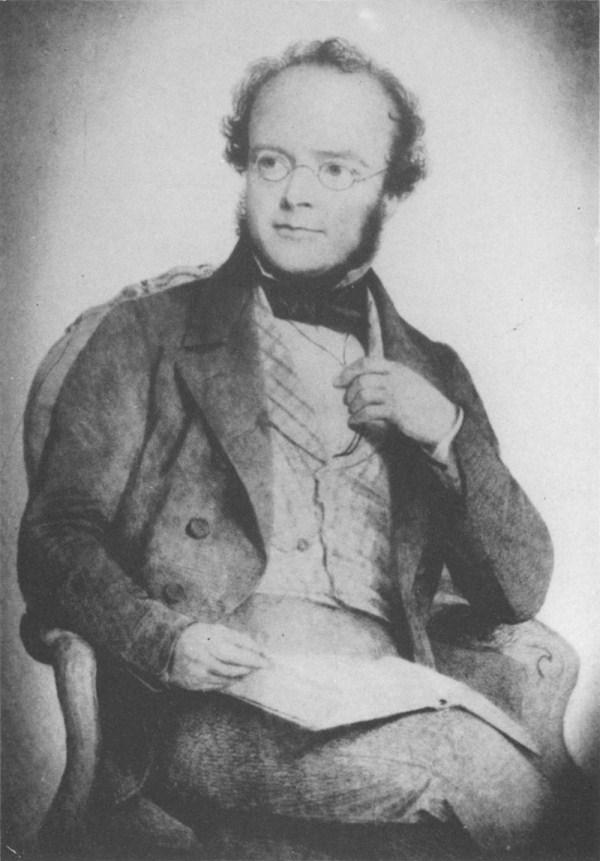
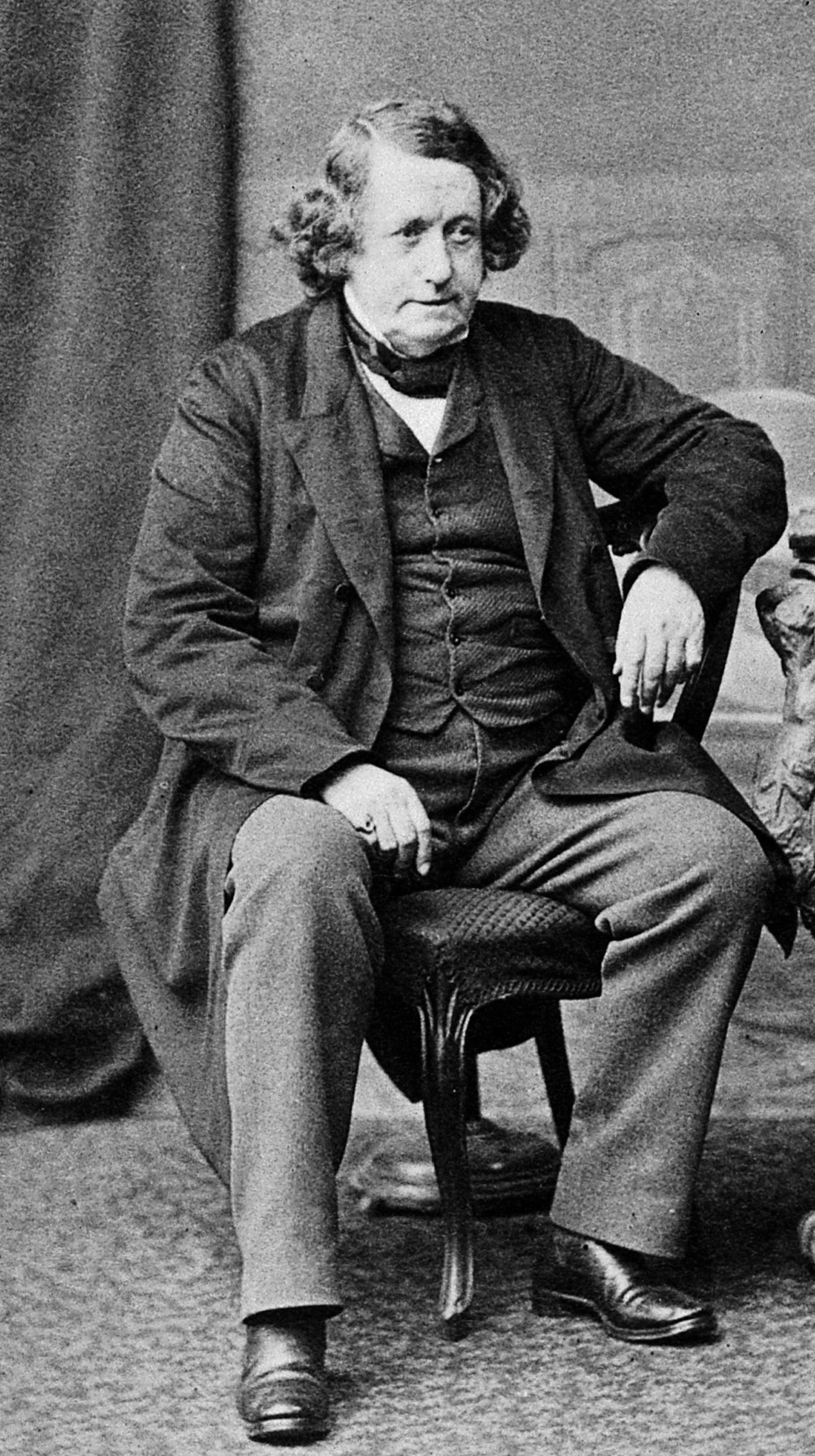
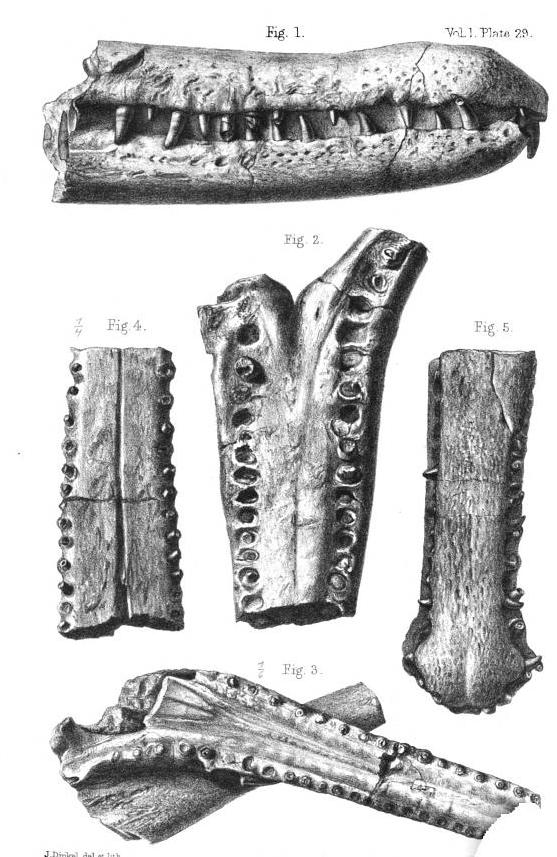
Proby Thomas Cautley (left) and Hugh Falconer (right) were pioneers when it came to collecting fossils from the Siwalik Hills, with their finds including crocodilian remains they dubbed Crocodilus crassidens (bottom, fig. 1 and fig. 2).

The first fossils recovered from India's Siwalik Hills were reportedly found in the early 19th century during the construction of irrigation canals, when they were noted by the supervising engineer Proby Thomas Cautley and Scottish naturalist Hugh Falconer, a collaborator of Cautley's. Among their finds were the remains of an enormous crocodile first described in an 1840 publication, which the team dubbed Leptorhynchus crassidens, with Leptorhynchus being a subgenus of Crocodilus at the time. The holotype, a partial snout tip catalogued under the specimen number NHMUK PV OR 39802, was later illustrated by Falconer in 1868 alongside additional material. These specimens were later reassigned to the genus Gharialis by Richard Lydekker in 1880.

Lydekker himself went on to name several fossil crocodilians from the Siwalik Hills only a few years later in 1886, among them Gharialis hysudricus, Gharialis curvirostris, and Gharialis pachyrhynchus, with the latter reportedly from the Laki Hills (Lower Siwaliks) of Sindh as well as Sehwan. The same publication also saw Lydekker write extensively about Gharialis crassidens, providing a detailed description of the material. Through this, Lydekker came to the conclusion that the material differed significantly from that of modern gharials, leading to him arguing for the distinct nature of the taxon and coining a new generic name: Rhamphosuchus.

Guy Pilgrim was another scientist working with fossils from the region; he also named multiple species of gavialoids, including Gharialis curvirostris var. gajensis and Gharialis breviceps. Both were collected from the Gaj of Kumbi in the Bugti Hills and described in 1912, with G. breviceps in part based on material that had previously been assigned to Pilgrim's Gharialis curvirostris.

Though the subsequent years had the occasional attribution of isolated or fragmentary remains to Rhamphosuchus, no major research was conducted on the animal until the 2000s. In 2000, a complete skull of a large tomistomine was recovered from the Potwar Plateau (Miocene Chinji Formation) of Pakistan. This skull, which was tentatively assigned to Rhamphosuchus crassidens, prompted Professor Jason J. Head, a researcher of Cenozoic reptiles, to publish an abstract discussing major upcoming revisions of the genus, ranging from its phylogenetic placement to a now widely accepted reduction in estimated body size. However, while this abstract was frequently cited by subsequent authors, it was never published in full.

In 2019, Jeremy E. Martin published a preliminary revision of several species placed in the genus Gavialis (which had been prioritized over "Gharialis"), focusing on those named by Lydekker and Pilgrim from the Siwalik and Bugti Hills. In this study, Martin argues that most of these species cannot be referred to Gavialis, but instead share varying degrees of similarity with Rhamphosuchus; both "Gavialis" breviceps and "Gavialis" curvirostris (including "G." curvirostris var. gajensis) were regarded as potentially, either representing new genera, or being synonyms of Rhamphosuchus, with "Gavialis" curvirostris having been hypothesized to represent a subadult or perhaps an individual of the opposite sex to previously described Rhamphosuchus specimen. "Gavialis" pachyrhynchus was likewise tentatively referred to Rhamphosuchus crassidens, with Martin specifically noting the fact that both taxa share their enormous size. Finally, Gavialis leptodus was speculated to represent a juvenile Rhamphosuchus. However, in all these cases Martin noted that the results were merely preliminary and that this new classification scheme would require more thorough descriptions of not only these putative Gavialis species (some of which were only studied through replica casts of the fossils), but also a complete revision of Rhamphosuchus and a full description of the skull previously mentioned by Head.

In 2025, Head contributed to a book titled "At the Foot of the Himalayas", which details the palaeontological study of the Siwalik Hills. Here, he again referenced the Potwar Skull discovered in 2000, though contrary to his 2001 abstract, Head's writing in the book suggests that the Potwar Skull does not belong to Rhamphosuchus crassidens, but instead could represent its own genus distinguished by, among other things, proportional differences and features of the palatal surface. In regards to the latter, Head does entertain the idea that the hypodigm (the sum of specimens other than the holotype) of Rhamphosuchus could be chimeric, with one specimen distinguishing Rhamphosuchus from the Potwar Skull potentially coming from a different animal. Head also noted similarities between the Potwar Skull and "Gavialis" breviceps, agreeing with Martin that "G." pachyrhynchus is indistinguishable from Rhamphosuchus, thus is a species of said genus.

Further revisions were made not long after the publication of this book, this time through a study by Erwan Courville, et al. Their results effectively continued Martin's work, going into greater detail and providing complete redescriptions of both "Gavialis" curvirostris and "G." pachyrhynchus based on both historical specimens and newer finds made during the 1990s. While "G." curvirostris was placed in its own genus, Pseudogavialis, "G." pachyrhynchus was transferred to genus Rhamphosuchus as its second species, resulting in the new combination Rhamphosuchus pachyrhynchus. The hypodigm of "G." curvirostris var. gajensis was split between Pseudogavialis and Rhamphosuchus, with the material assigned to the latter potentially representing a third species that is yet to be named. "G." breviceps was fully sunk into (and the name synonimized with) Rhamphosuchus pachyrhynchus, while G. leptodus was recognized as a distinct species contrary to Martin's hypothesis.

== Species ==
Skull diagram and size comparison of different specimens of the genus.

- Rhamphosuchus crassidens (Type)

The remains that build the basis for Rhamphosuchus crassidens were discovered during the early 19th century in the Siwalik Hills of India in sediments generally thought to be Pliocene in age. Some elements have been reported from the Pliocene pre-Pinjor Beds near Chandigarh (which is referred to, depending on the source, as either the Dhamala, Saketi or Tatrot Formation). Though based on the fact that its original type specimens were recovered from the area that is probably situated between Yamuna and Sutlej river(most likely Chandigarh or nearby regions), and due to many crocodilians described from typical siwalik hills by Lydekker 1886 also being from this region (e.g. Crocodylus palaeindicus), it may have lived during Late Pliocene and likely the Early Middle Pleistocene of Pinjor Formation, another hint that supports this hypothesis is that the original 1840 paper mentions Rhamphosuchus crassidens alongside numerous other animals that matches the Plio-Pleistocene interval, like Camelus sivalensis, Anoplotherium sivalense, Hippopotamus sivalensis, Sivatherium, Felis cristata, Rhinoceros and Ursus sivalensis. While Rhamphosuchus crassidens has been known to science for over 150 years, it remains very poorly understood, partially on account of the generally fragmentary remains assigned to this taxon. A redescription with additional remains was in the works under Jason J. Head, but was never published, with some of the preliminary conclusions of this work being subsequently rejected by Head himself. Head has raised the possibility that at least one specimen historically referred to this species could be of a different taxon. Rhamphosuchus crassidens is chiefly set apart from R. pachyrhynchus by lacking the expanded snout tip, instead showing a smoother transition between the premaxilla and the rest of the rostrum.

- Rhamphosuchus pachyrhynchus

The remains of Rhamphosuchus pachyrhynchus were first described in 1886, but were only recognized to be similar to R. crassidens in the late 2010s, and subsequently recognized as the second species of Rhamphosuchus in 2025. This species is known from the Oligocene to Miocene Laki Hills of the Lower Siwaliks (possibly part of the Chinji Formation, considered to be mid-Miocene in some studies) as well as earliest Miocene Bugti Hills (Upper Chitarwata Formation), with all confirmed specimens occurring from Pakistan. There is at least one specimen tentatively referred to this species, referred to as R. cf. pachyrhynchus from the Early Miocene Khari Nadi Formation of India. A key difference that separates R. pachyrhynchus from R. crassidens concerns the shape and size of the naris and the snout tip surrounding it, which is more expanded in this species compared to R. crassidens.

=== Other occurrences and unnamed species ===
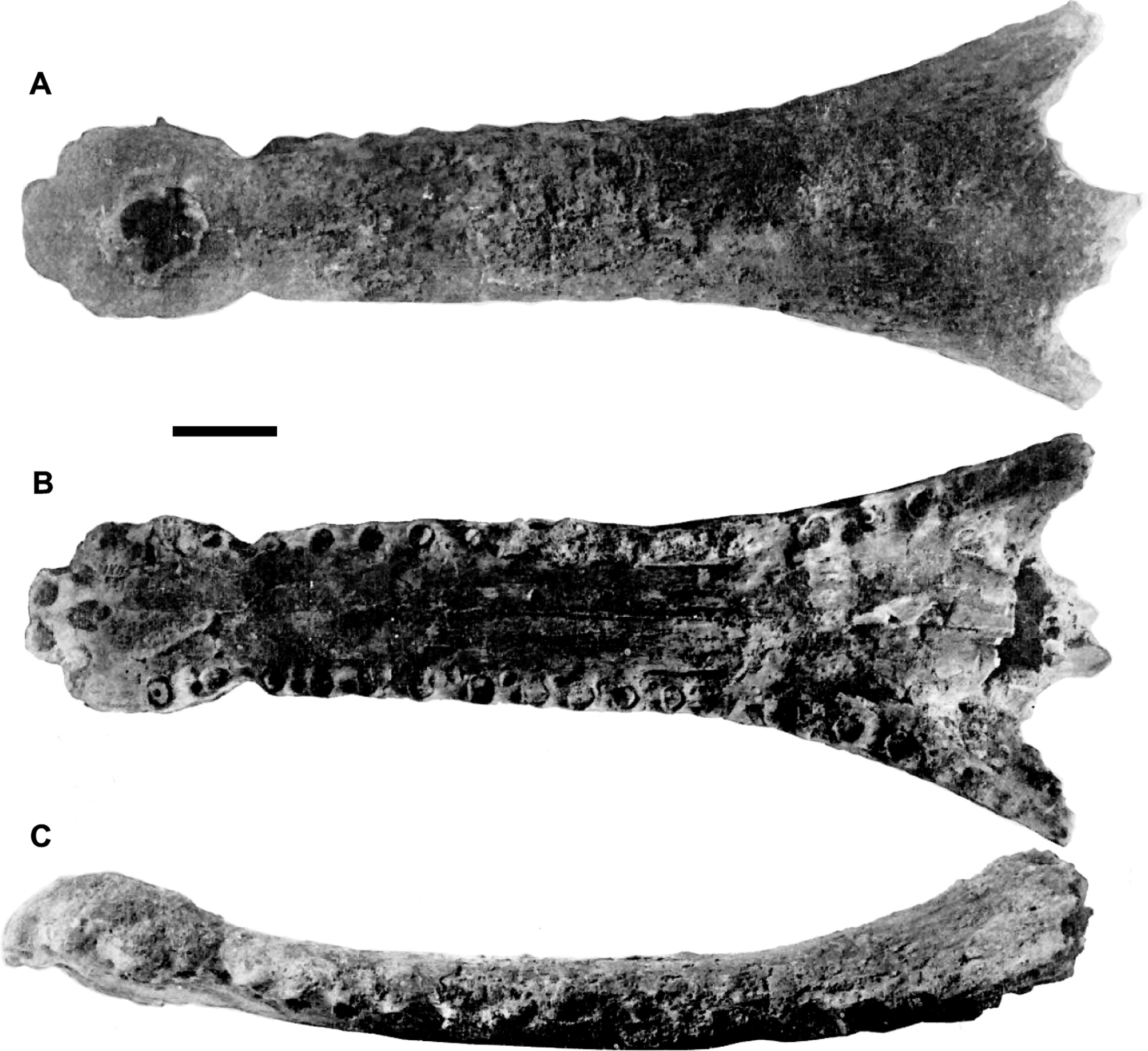
GSI (IM) E222, a fossil likely belonging to a third species of Rhamphosuchus

Gavialoid fossils from Nepal have also been referred to Rhamphosuchus crassidens, though they are highly fragmentary. Gudrun Corvinus and H. Hermann Schleich specifically mention a snout tip from the locality of Rato Khola and isolated teeth from the locality of Surai Khola, with both being part of the Surai Khola Formation. These strata that have been correlated to the Tatrot/Pinjor faunal zone of India, as well as the Hexaprotodon sivalensis Interval Zone of the Upper Siwaliks in Pakistan, making these referred specimens roughly Middle Pliocene in age. The remains mentioned by Corvinus and Schleich are also briefly discussed by Courville and colleagues, who regard them as coming from the Tatrot Formation. While previous studies listed these remains as Rhamphosuchus crassidens, Courville et al. are more hesitant, merely referring them to cf. Rhamphosuchus sp. based on the spacing of the teeth.

In 2001 Jason J. Head reported the discovery of a complete crocodilian skull from the Potwar Plateau (Chinji Formation) of Pakistan that he initially believed to belong to Rhamphosuchus crassidens. While this skull was long thereafter assigned to the genus, and therefore thought to extend the range of R. crassidens into the Miocene of Pakistan, Head came to reject this initial hypothesis in his more recent work; in the 2025 book "At the Foot of the Himalayas: Paleontology and Ecosystem Dynamics of the Siwalik Record", Head identifies the Potwar Plateau taxon as an indeterminate species of tomistomine. The Potwar tomistomine was similar in size to Rhamphosuchus, but is distinguished by Head as possessing a more robust rostrum with fewer teeth. He also notes that the fossil shares some features with "Gavialis" breviceps which are not seen in R. crassidens, though the "G." breviceps' subsequent synonymy with R. pachyrhynchus by Courville and colleagues does mean that the matter remains unresolved.

In addition to establishing Rhamphosuchus pachyrhynchus as a new combination for "Gavialis" pachyrhynchus, Courville and colleagues also take note of some specimens that do not entirely match either of the two recognized species. Some specimen from the Bugti Hills are tentatively referred to R. pachyrhynchus but do differ in some detail, possibly representing different species. In addition to these, one specimen from the Bugti Hills, which historically had been assigned to "Gavialis" curvirostris var. gajensis, is tentatively assigned to Rhamphosuchus by the research team, but clearly distinct from either R. crassidens or R. pachyrhynchus. The anatomy of this animal appears somewhat intermediate between Pseudogavialis and R. pachyrhynchus and it either represents a distinct species of Rhamphosuchus or an entirely new genus. Its precise age however is unknown as the Kumbi locality where the material originates from exposes both Oligocene and Miocene sediments, with Guy Pilgrim never having specified the exact stratigraphic origin of his finds.

== Description ==
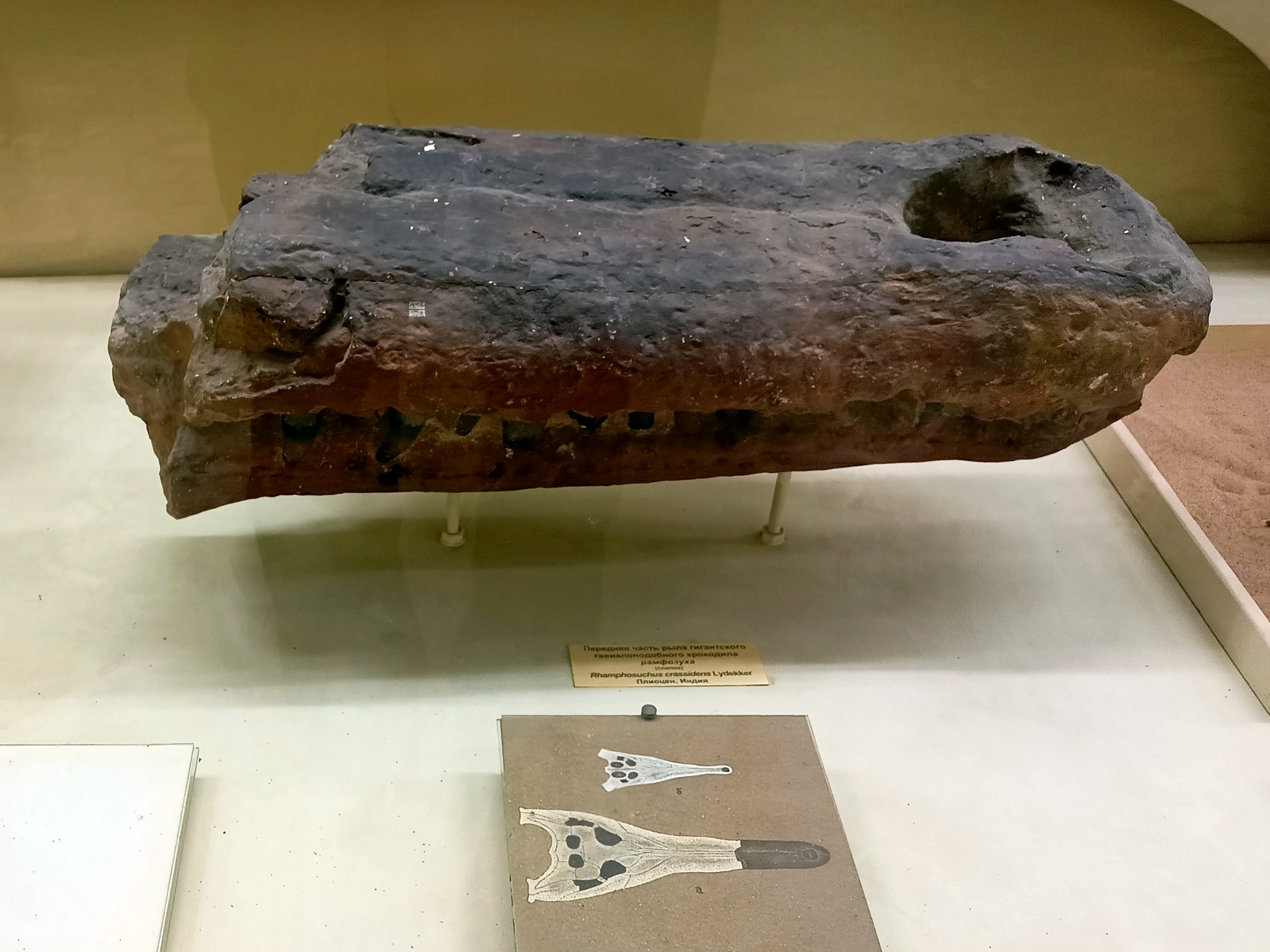
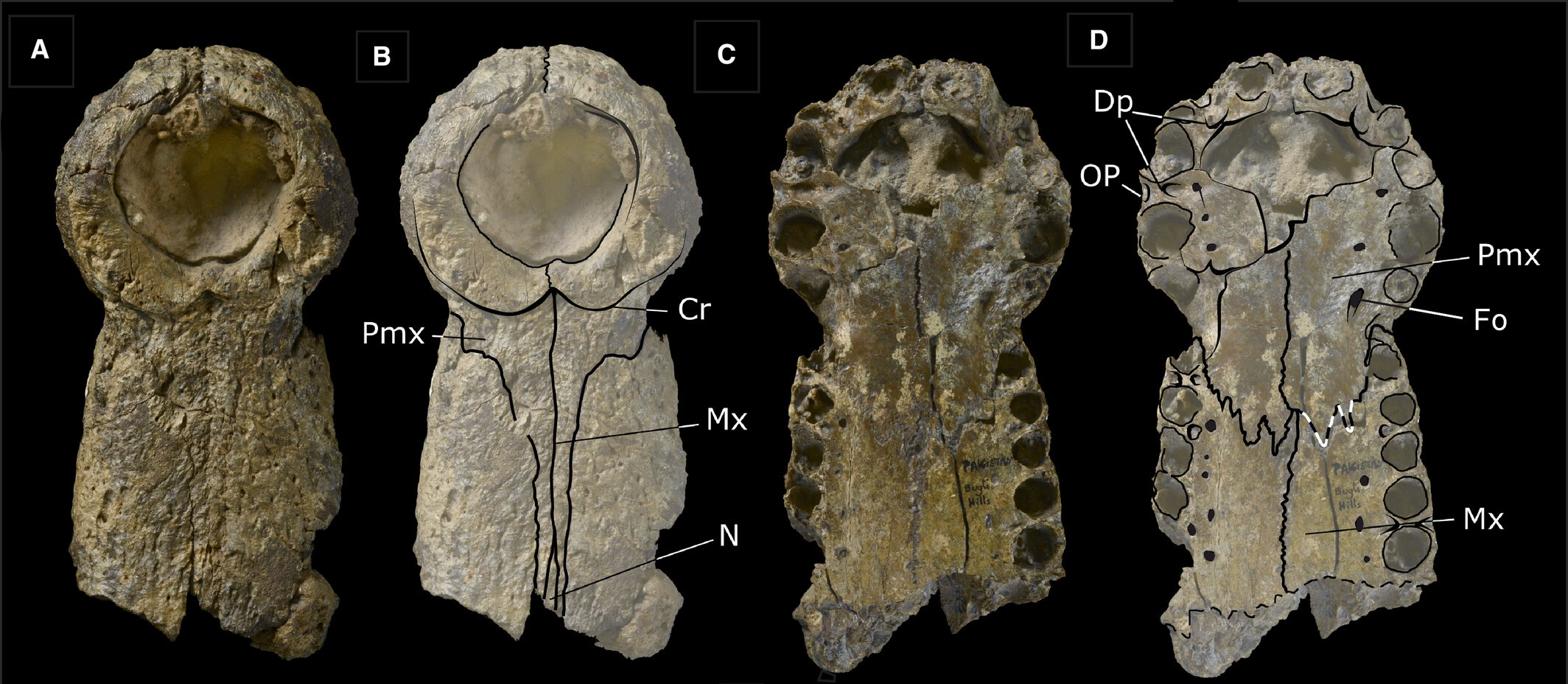
The snout tip of Rhamphosuchus crassidens (top) compared to that of Rhamphosuchus pachyrhynchus (bottom).

Rhamphosuchus were large-bodied crocodilians possessing the elongated and narrow jaws typical of gavialoids. However while the rostrum (snout) of Rhamphosuchus was proportionally narrow compared to that of generalist crocodylids (the "true" crocodiles), it was nonetheless quite robust compared to other gavialoids. Jason Head described the skull of Rhamphosuchus as being more robust than that of the modern false gharial, though Head's interpretation was in part based on the Potwar Plateau Skull, which he later considered as a distinct taxon more robust than even Rhamphosuchus crassidens. Disregarding this specimen, Courville and colleagues still noted that Rhamphosuchus pachyrhynchus is one of the most robust crocodilians of the Bugti and Siwalik Hills, only outdone by R. crassidens and the enormous crocodyloid Astorgosuchus. One specimen formerly assigned to "Gavialis" breviceps is even described as meso- or even brevirostrine, atypical of Gavialoidea. The more robust morphology displayed by Rhamphosuchus comes in part from the fact that the margins of both the upper and lower jaw diverge outward towards the back of the skull; the snout broadens the closer it gets towards the eye sockets. This expansion is the least pronounced in the unnamed Bugti Hill species, but is still present. This broadening of the snout contrasts with modern Indian gharials, where the margins of the jaws run parallel to each other for much of the rostrum, retaining a relatively even jaw width from front to back.

As remains of Rhamphosuchus are generally fragmentary in nature, one way the proportional robustness of the snout has been illustrated is through the ratio between the length of the toothrow and the width across the rostrum; Pilgrim compared the length from the front margin of the first maxillary (upper jaw) tooth to the back of the third maxillary tooth with the width of the snout across the fourth maxillary tooth. In R. pachyrhynchus, this shows that the length across these three teeth was only half the width of the rostrum at the designated point. By comparison, in both species of extant gavialoids the Indian and false gharials, as well as Gavialis lewisi and Pseudogavialis, all have rostra in which the snout width at the fourth maxillary tooth is about the same as the length across the first three teeth of the maxilla. This reinforces the fact that the jaws of Rhamphosuchus were much more robust than those of its modern relatives.

The most obvious difference between the two named species of Rhamphosuchus concerns the shape of the tip of the snout, which are formed by the premaxillae. In R. pachyrhynchus the premaxilla expands outward, making it much wider than the anterior region of the maxilla and giving the tip of the snout a rounded appearance. The narrowest point of the premaxilla is located near the contact with the maxilla, where both R. pachyrhynchus and the unnamed Bugti Hill species possess a marked notch that receives the fourth dentary tooth. The external nares is also rounded and almost circular. From a side view, the lateral margins around the naris are also expanded; the premaxilla is set much higher than the rest of the rostrum. The anterior-most tip (very front) of the premaxilla is described as almost vertical. The premaxilla extends towards the back until around the level of the sixth maxillary tooth, where it forms a triple-suture with the maxilla and the paired nasal bones, which extend into the space between the left and right premaxillary processes.

Rhamphosuchus crassidens lacks the lateral expansion around the naris and the premaxilla is instead around the same height and width as the maxilla. Just anterior to the naris of R. crassidens, the premaxilla are marked by a pair of fossae (depressions). Unlike R. pachyrhynchus, the nasals and the premaxillae are not contact and are instead widely separated by the maxillae. This separation of premaxillae and nasals might also be found in the unnamed Bugti Hills species, however it is noted that in that form this condition is much less clear than in R. crassidens due to what might be the fossil's poor preservation.

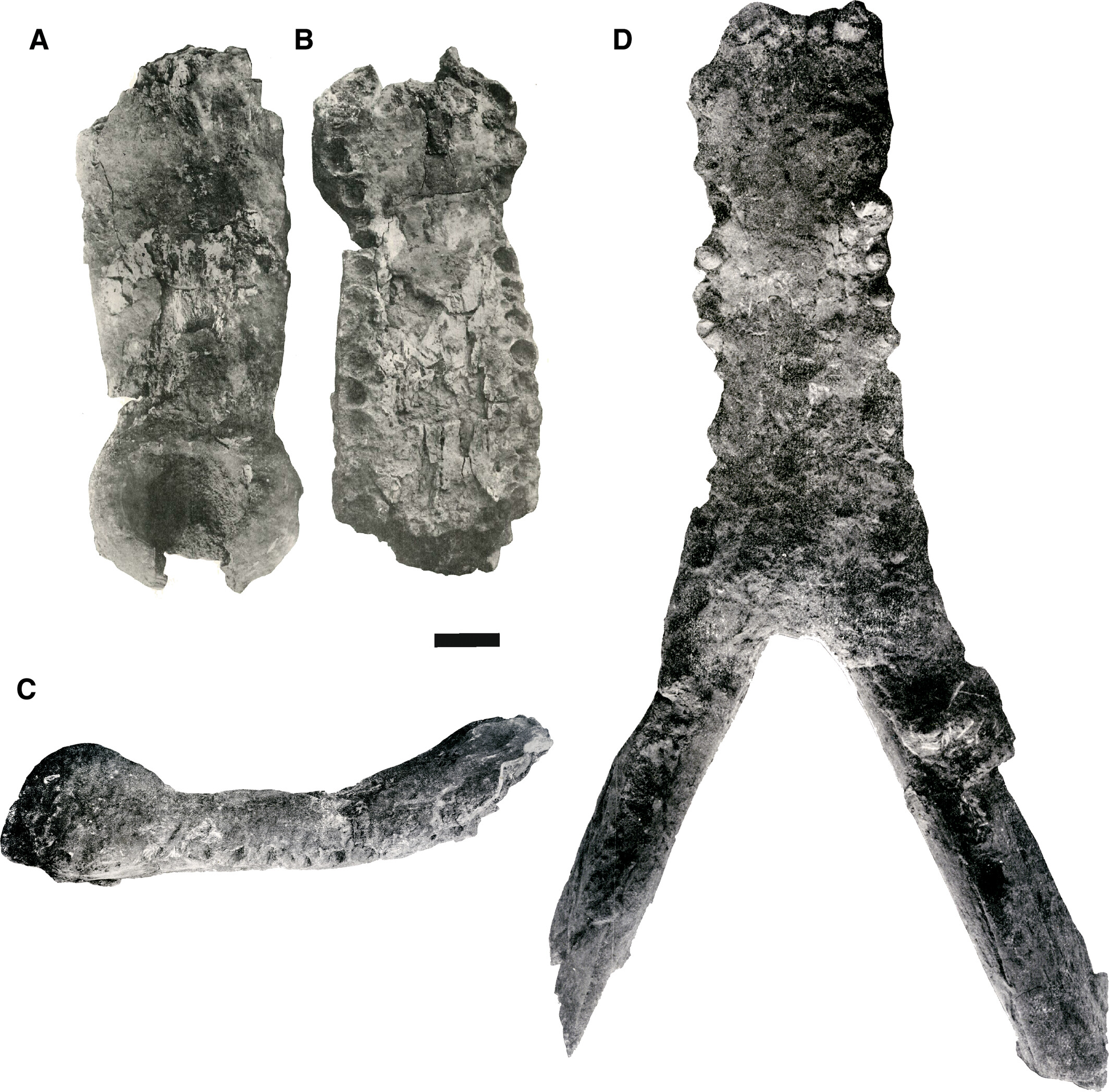
The snout and lower jaw of Rhamphosuchus pachyrhynchus

In both species the posterior end of the naris is flat, smooth and leads into a marked ridge or crest that forms a V towards the back of the premaxillae. However, in Rhamphosuchus crassidens this crest is much lighter and the premaxillae furthermore bear an additional depression in front of the naris.

The posterior portion of the skull is best preserved in the unnamed Bugti Hills species, which preserves the edges of the eyesockets and the surrounding bones. The margins of the eyesockets are rounded but unlike in modern Indian gharials they are not upturned, meaning that the eyes do not appear to have been "telescoped" as in the modern animal. The interorbital region (the space between the eyes) is relatively narrow, being a little over half the width of the rostrum across the fourth maxillary tooth. By comparison, the interorbital space in derived gavialoids such as Pseudogavialis is much wider, up to 80% of the rostral width.

From below, the premaxilla extends posterior to the third maxillary tooth, making it longer than in most tomistomines but shorter than in other gavialoids. In addition to occlusal pits (divots in the upper jaw that the teeth of the lower slots into), the ventral surface of the upper jaw also preserves distinct pits in its surface. Such pits can be found between the first two premaxillary teeth and between the third and fourth premaxillary teeth. The pits are deep and pierced by several small foramina, possibly indicating that these pits function as a point of insertion for a sensory structure. The maxilla stops shortly following the end of the toothrow, far away from the posterior end of the adjacent ectopterygoid bone. Like in the false gharial, the ectopterygoid stretches forward towards the anterior margin of the penultimate toothsocket, which is notably shorter than in members of the genus Gavialis as well as the gavialoids of South America. The contact between ectopterygoid and jugal curves gently, whereas in Gavialis it forms a medially located posterior process along the contact with the latter.

=== Mandible ===
The tip of the lower jaw is not as expanded as seen in derived gavialoids, instead being much closer to the rest of the mandibular symphysis in width. The symphysis is nevertheless almost thrice as wide as it is deep, much closer to the wide and flat lower jaws of derived gavialoids instead of the narrow mandibles of tomistomines. In Rhamphosuchus the splenial contributes to the mandibular symphysis beginning with the ninth or tenth dentary alveoli ((tooth sockets)) and spans the following five to six sockets in R. pachyrhynchus and seven sockets in R. crassidens. This extent of the splenial is similar to that of tomistomines, whereas in derived gavialoids such as Gavialis the splenial can span up to ten dentary alveoli. Similarly, the mandibular symphysis of Rhamphosuchus is shorter than that of gavialoids, only spanning around 15 teeth while in the latter the symphysis might extend beyond the 20th dentary tooth. Like with the upper jaw, the lateral margins of the mandible diverge rather than run parallel to each other. The surangular extends into the space between the splenial and dentary, but like the splenial it doesn't actually contact the margins of any dentary alveoli.

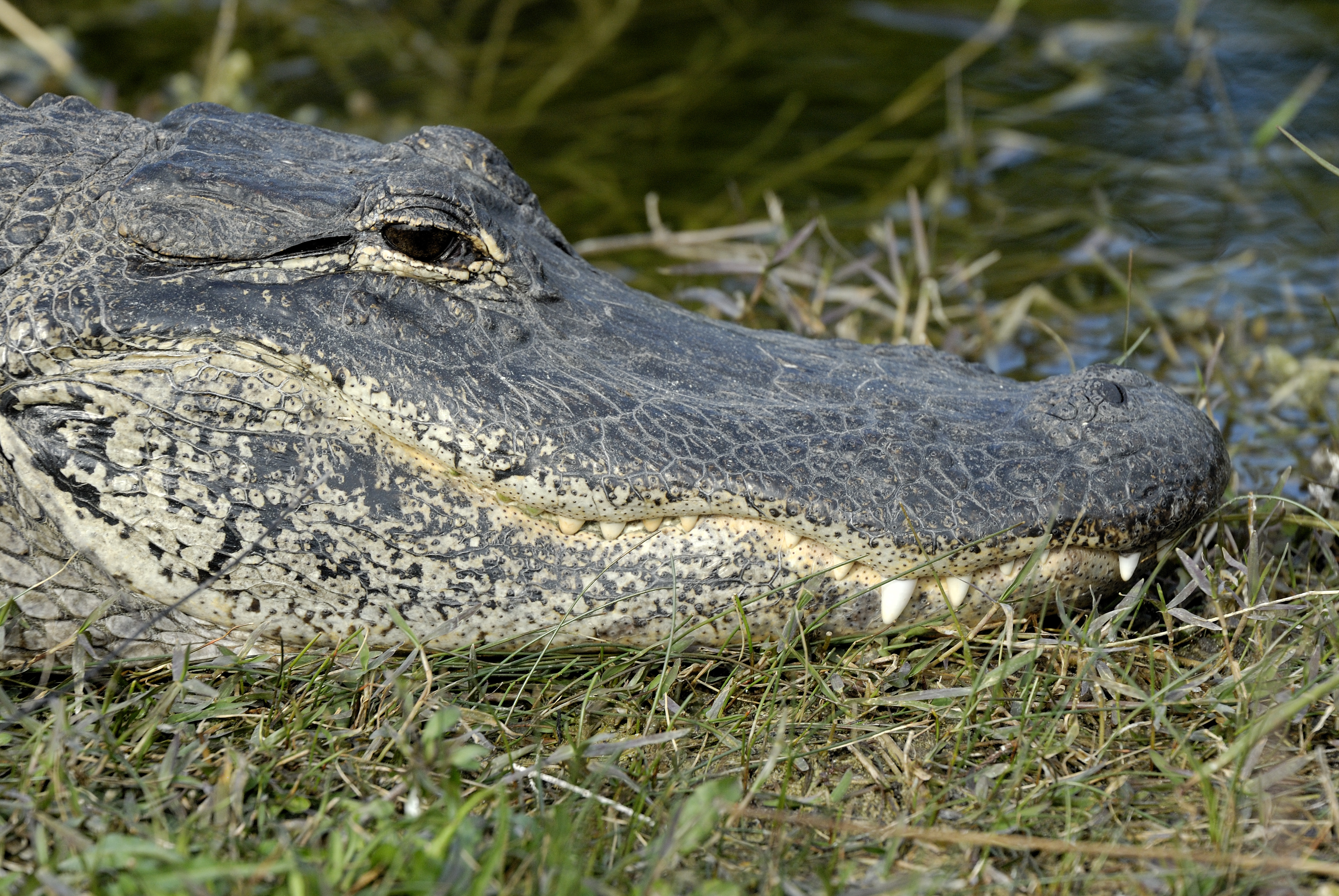
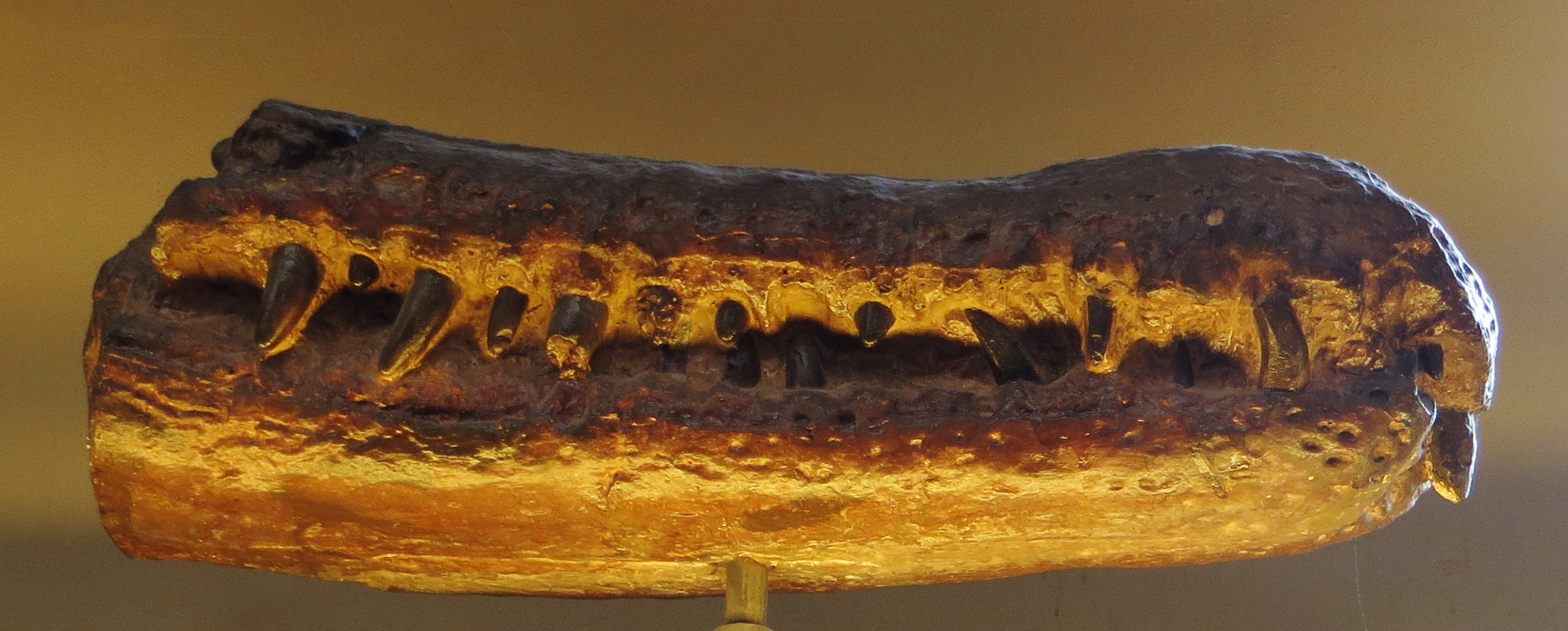
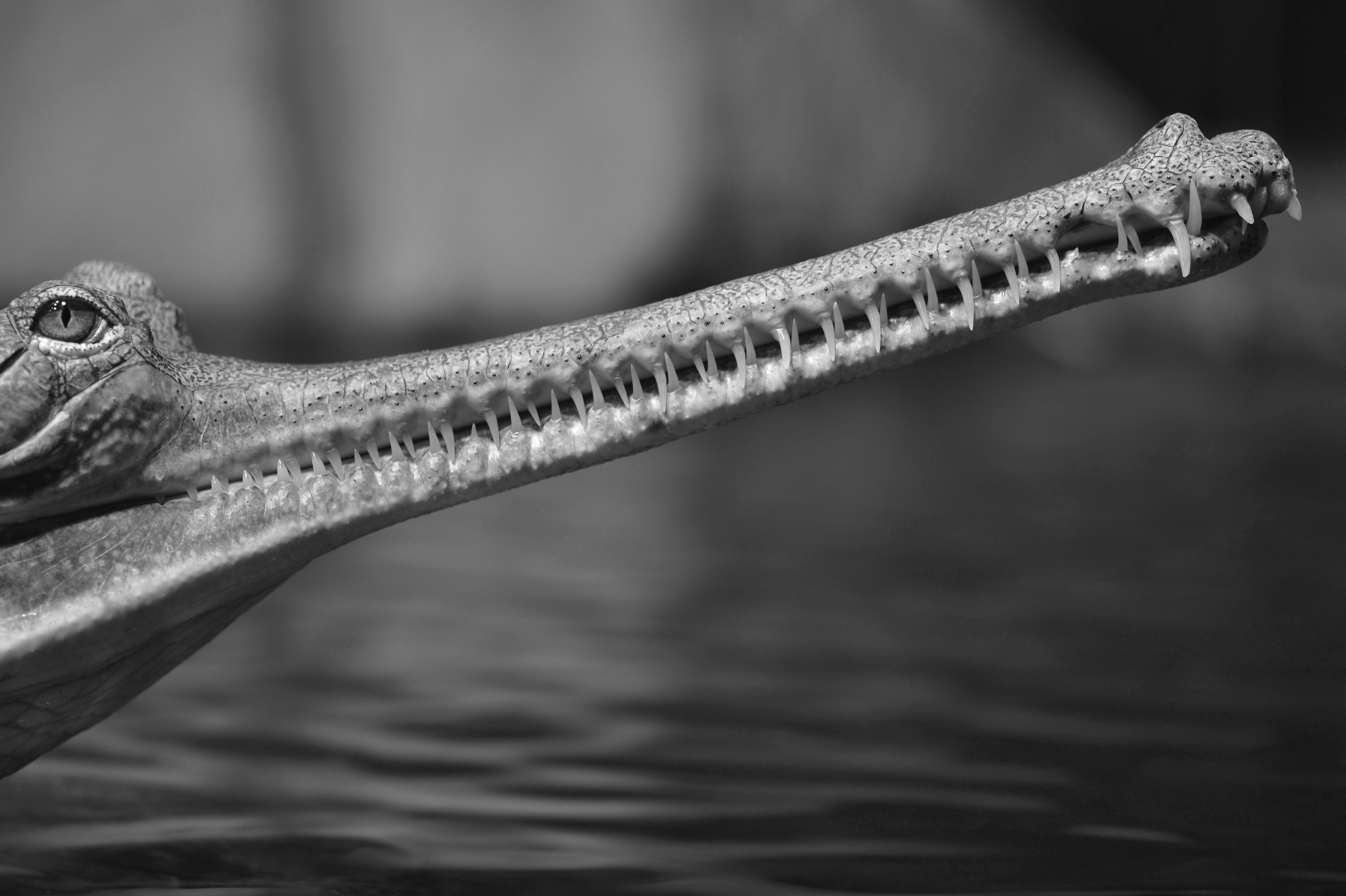
Tooth occlusion of an American alligator (top), Rhamphosuchus crassidens (middle), and an Indian gharial (bottom).

=== Dentition ===
Each premaxilla of Rhamphosuchus contained five teeth based on the number of tooth sockets, the same number as in modern Indian gharials and one more than in adult false gharials. Among these the first, third and fourth are all described as being larger than the second and fifth and their arrangement helps differentiate Rhamphosuchus from the contemporary Pseudogavialis. The third and fourth alveoli are positioned parallel to the midline of the snout with the fifth tooth medially inset to these two. While the fourth might be slightly more lateral than the third, the third is always more lateral than the first maxillary tooth. The precise count of maxillary teeth is uncertain, with at least nine being confirmed for R. pachyrhynchus based on partial snout remains and 17 in the unnamed species from the Bugti Hills. Given that the lower jaw contains 20 alveoli, Pilgrim has hypothesized that the maxillary tooth count may have been equal to that or perhaps even higher. In the case of Rhamphosuchus crassidens a maxillary tooth count of at least 13 teeth has been suggested, but here too the true count was likely higher, with the animal possibly having had up to 18 maxillary teeth and over 16 dentary teeth.

The teeth of adult Rhamphosuchus are described as being very closely spaced. Both Jeremy E. Martin as well as Courville and colleagues note that there are for example no diastemas (gaps) between the third to fifth premaxillary teeth unlike the Indian gharial's teeth, giving the animal's premaxilla a proportionally shorter appearance. This close spacing continues onto the maxillary teeth, with the ratio between the tooth socket diameter and the space between alveoli being proportional to the width of the snout. This means that the larger the animal, the more closely spaced the teeth are, with smaller individuals having more widely spaced teeth than the large adults. The same applies to the dentition of the lower jaw, where the third and fourth alveoli are especially closely spaced and the distance between four and five is likewise short.

The teeth of Rhamphosuchus' entire maxillary toothrow varied in size throughout the jaw, unlike the uniform-sized teeth of Indian gharials and Pseudogavialis. In the two named species there is a noticeable increase in alveolar diameter across the first five maxillary teeth similar to what is seen in the false gharial, with the fifth alveolus being the widest. In the unnamed Bugti Hill species this size increase continues onto the sixth or seventh tooth. Similar to the close spacing of the teeth, the size increase of the teeth is much more prominent in the larger individuals of Rhamphosuchus. The first five maxillary teeth of R. pachyrhynchus also appear to perform a downwards curve when looking at the skull in lateral view. The first tooth is located relatively high up on the lateral edge of the maxilla, with each subsequent tooth leading up to the fifth being located further down. This feature is exclusive to this species; R. crassidens has its maxillary teeth arranged in a linear fashion like in Indian gharials and most other gavialoids. There are some exceptions as highlighted by Courville and colleagues, with a slight curvature being present in modern false gharials and a select few others while a stronger curvature can be found in basal tomistomines. As the downward curvature occurs across the first five teeth, which display the gradual increase in size, the two conditions are likely tied to one another, though this leaves Rhamphosuchus crassidens as an outlier if the co-occurrence were true, given that it also has varying tooth size while maintaining a linear toothrow.

Another key features that sets Rhamphosuchus apart from modern gharials is the manner the upper and lower toothrows interact with each other; both the Indian gharial and the false gharial possess teeth that interlock as is the case in crocodyloids, with each tooth sliding into the space between its counterparts in the opposing jaw, leaving so-called occlusal pits in the bone. However in the case of Rhamphosuchus, such pits are not found between the teeth of the maxilla but medial to them. This arrangement, which is caused by the lower jaw's narrowness compared to the upper, essentially giving the animals an "overbite" throughout the maxilla, similar to what is seen in modern alligators. Even the enlarged fourth dentary tooth of Rhamphosuchus crassidens slides into a pit on the inner side of the upper toothrow, while in modern alligators said pit is located behind, not on the inner side of the upper toothrow. On the other hand, the fourth dentary of R. pachyrhynchus seems to be exposed, sliding into a large notch between the premaxillary and maxillary toothrows. As far as the premaxilla is concerned, Lydekker describes that the first dentary tooth of Rhamphosuchus crassidens slides into a small notch. There are some triangular depressions between the posterior maxillary teeth that appear to be unrelated to dental occlusion.

=== Soft tissue ===
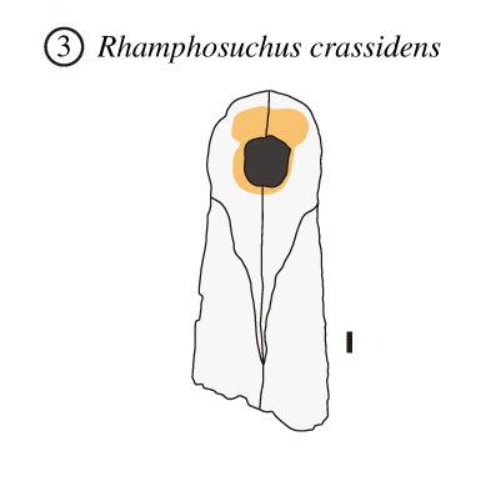
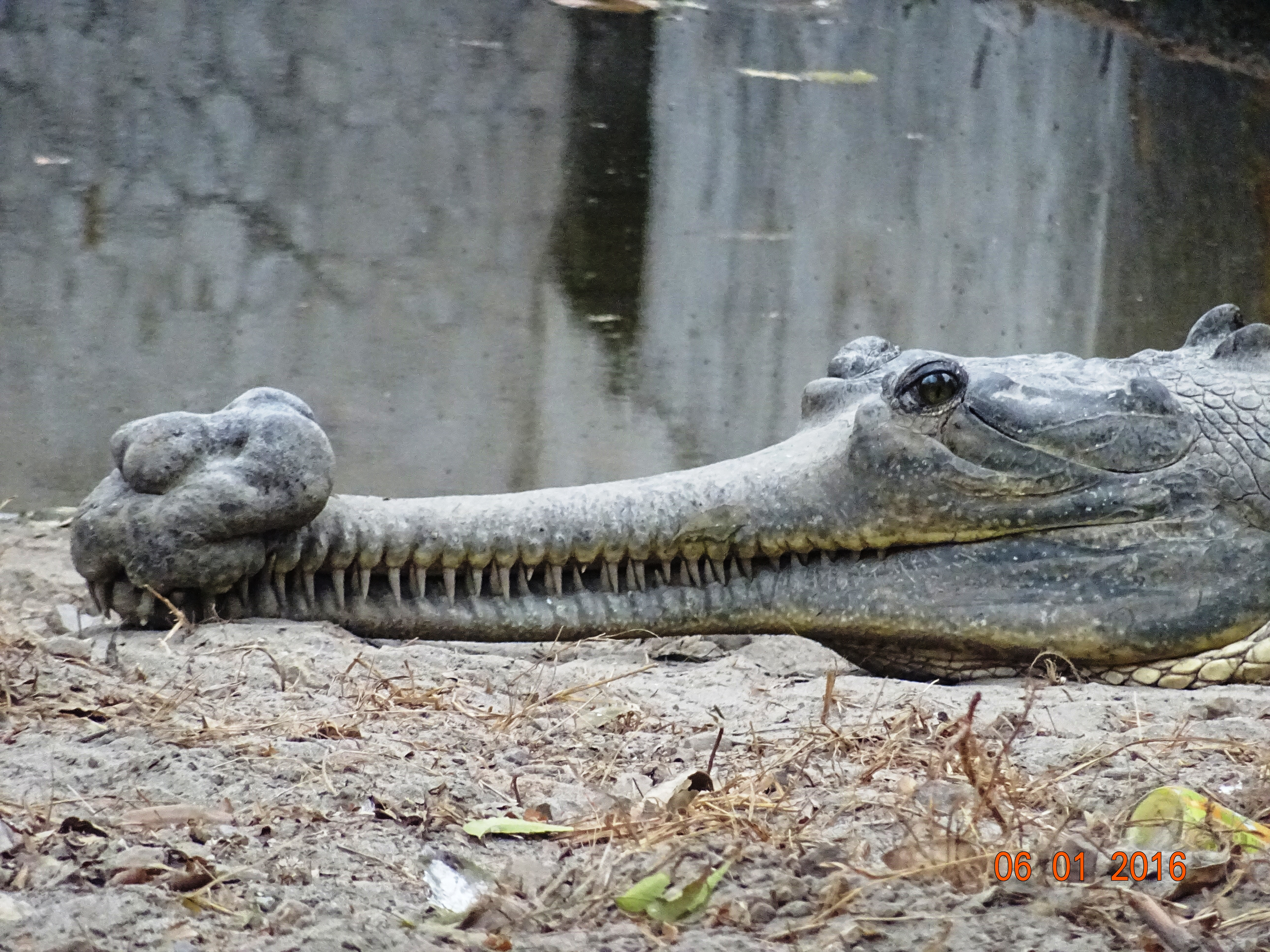
The fossae surrounding the naris of Rhamphosuchus (left) likely functioned as the attachment site for an elaborate soft tissue structure known as a ghara (right).

A notable feature of Rhamphosuchus pachyrhynchus is the presence of an unornamented region just behind the external naris, which is deliminated by a crest or ridge. Rhamphosuchus crassidens has been described as possessing perinarial depressions surrounding the opening, with a fossa anterior to the naris, in addition to the unornamented region behind the naris as also seen in R. pachyrhynchus. These regions drew comparison to the mature males of Indian gharials, in which similar osteological correlates are tied to the presence of a sexually dimorphic structure composed of cartilage, which is referred to as a narial excrescence or simply the ghara (after the earthen pot of the same name). The ghara appears as a knob-like, multi-chambered structure situated directly above the narial opening in living gharials, clearly distinguishing male gharials from the females which have more conservative narial soft tissue. The ghara of modern Indian gharials appears somewhat cuboid in shape or swept backwards and can be separated into anterior, lateral and posterior lobes that contribute to the complex shape of the structure. Potential attachment sites for gharas have been identified in at least ten extinct gavialoids, with this feature oftentimes associated with enlarged pterygoid bullae, though no mention of the latter is made by Courville and colleagues. Martin and Bellairs specifically note that the anterior fossa in Rhamphosuchus crassidens is partially separated into two concavities, which may correspond to a ghara that formed two large anterior lobes.

=== Size ===
Historically, many palaeontologists estimated Rhamphosuchus crassidens to be one of the largest, if not the largest crocodylian to have ever lived, with Lydekker estimating its length to have been somewhere between 15 to 18 m (49 to 59 ft) based on the proportions of modern gharials. While this estimate was frequently used in the following hundred years, more recent studies have favored significantly smaller size estimates. The turning point came with Jason Head's research, who estimated a total length of around 8 to 11 m (26 to 36 ft) based on all known specimens, smaller than the upper estimates cited for some other crocodylomorphs at the time. Subsequent authors tend to remain within this range for size estimates, with some sticking to the lower and others to the upper estimates.

The second species, Rhamphosuchus pachyrhynchus, has also been noted for its immense size, with Lydekker initially proposing a similar size range to R. crassidens at 15 to 18 m (49 to 59 ft). In 2019 Jeremy E. Martin noted the species for being "strikingly huge" and of a similar size to the type species (which by that point had been downsized from Lydekker's initial estimates), though refraining from a precise estimate. Courville and colleagues, who moved the species to the genus Rhamphosuchus in 2025, provided a more modest estimate for this species, suggesting it might have reached a length between 6 to 8 m (20 to 26 ft).

== Phylogeny ==
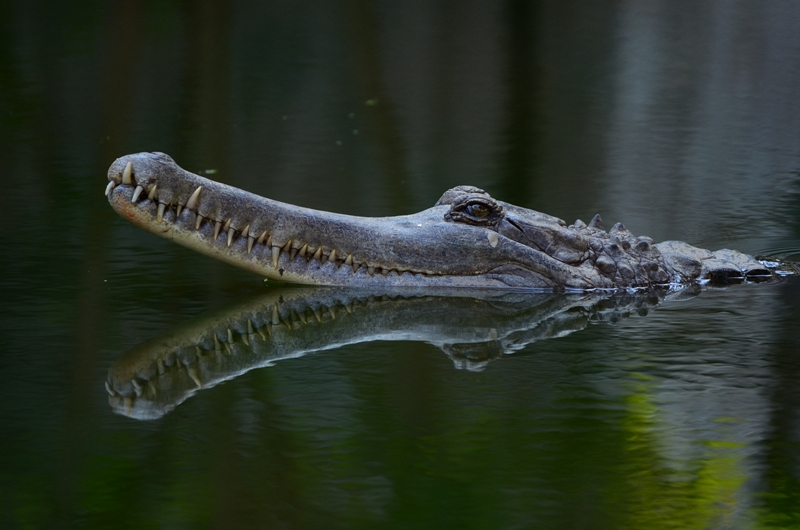
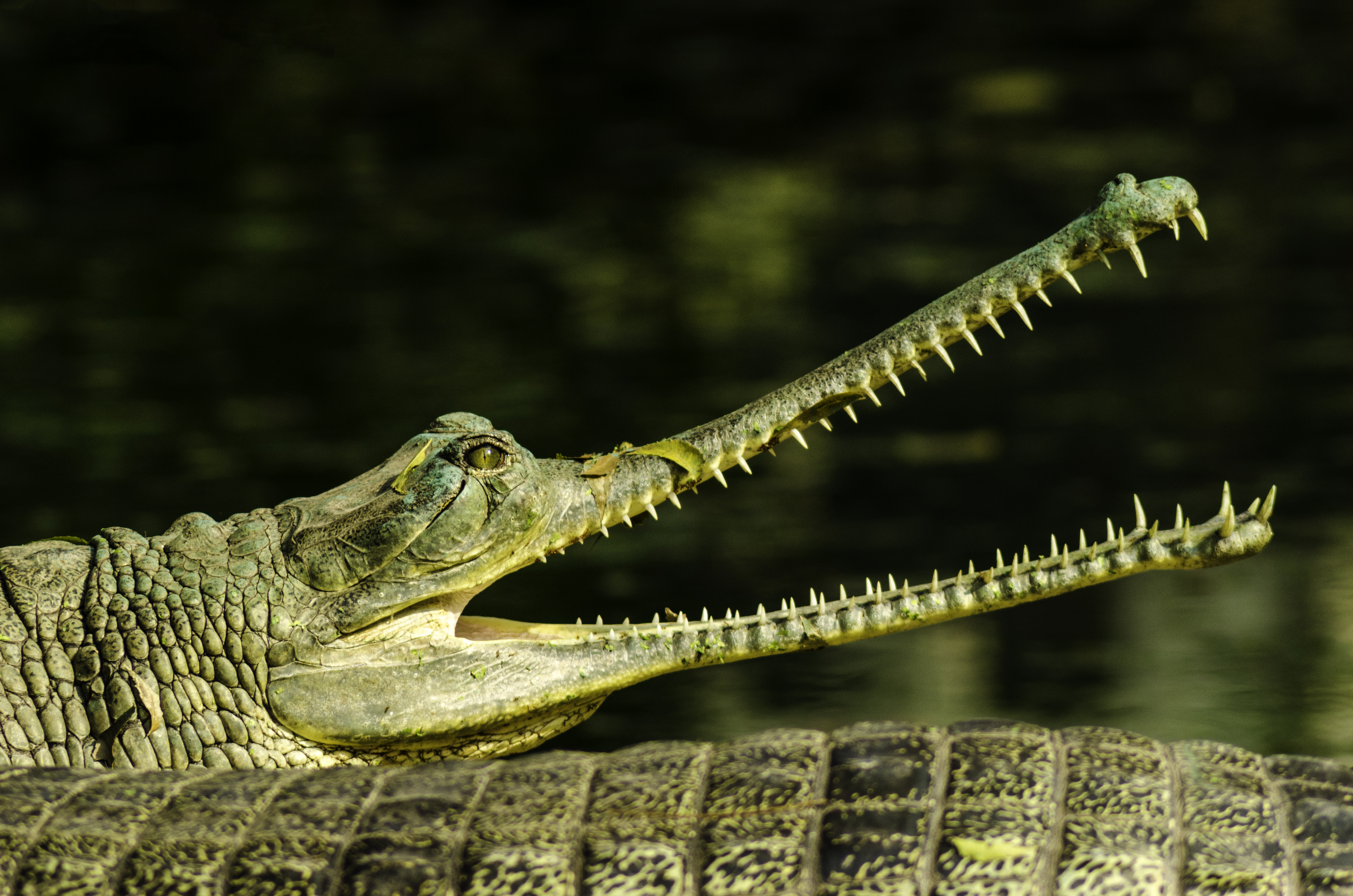
While it is now generally accepted that Rhamphosuchus is a member of the Gavialoidea, it has historically been disputed whether or not it was more closely related to the false gharial (top) or the Indian gharial (bottom).

The phylogenetic position of Rhamphosuchus among crocodilians has shifted throughout its research history, not only due to the incomplete nature of the type material but also because of the long-debated relationship between the two groups it was generally referred to. The two hypothesis place Rhamphosuchus either as a close relative to the modern-day false gharial within the subfamily Tomistominae or as a relative of today's Indian gharial, long classified as the only surviving member of the Gavialoidea. Between these two, the interpretation of it as a tomistomine has long been the most frequently used, generally under the assumption that tomistomines were actually a group of crocodyloids that convergently evolved a slender-snout similar to gavialoids. A placement within Gavialoidea to the exclusion of tomistomines can be found in older works such as a 1934 study by Charles C. Mook. A more recent example of this placement can be found in studies by Sebastian S. Groh and colleagues, who recovered it as an early branching gavialoid alongside Piscogavialis in 2020, and again as an early branching gavialoid in 2022, though in the latter they reaffirm it as a tomistomine and argue that these particular results are likely influenced by the taxon's fragmentary nature.

However, recent molecular studies have increasingly shown that this separation between tomistomines and gavialoids is not supported by genetic evidence, as these studied recovered tomistomines as a paraphyletic group within Gavialidae leading up to gavialines. This line of thinking has since then also been replicated by morphological studies, notably the work of Jonathan Rio & Philip D. Mannion. While Rhamphosuchus would remain a gavialoid regardless of its proximity to whichever modern species, the question of its exact relation — whether it was closer to Tomistoma and other basal gavialoids, or closer to Gavialis — remains uncertain. Robert E. Weems for instance included Rhamphosuchus among tomistomines in 2018. By contrast, Iijima and colleagues only denoted Rhamphosuchus as a "tomistomine" (within parentheses) in their works which includes description of Hanyusuchus in 2022, indicating their reservations toward this classification scheme. Though this 2022 paper does not given a concrete placement within their phylogenetic tree, it is visually placed closer to Gavialis and far away from their much more reduced concept of Tomistominae, again indicating closer affinities with gavialines rather than traditional tomistomines.

The inconsistent nature of Rhamphosuchus classification is well exemplified by the results of Courville et al. (2025). In their work, which described the second species Rhamphosuchus pachyrhynchus, the team recovered multiple phylogenetic trees that essentially cover most of the previous hypothesis. In their phylogenetic tree that resulted from the use of equally weighted characters, gavialoids and tomistomines sit at opposite branches of the crocodilian family tree similar to classical morphological trees, but Rhamphosuchus itself was alternatively recovered as either a gavialoid outside the split between modern gavialines and gryposuchines, or as a tomistomine closely allied with the Miocene-Holocene Asian radiation of taxa, which consists of Penghusuchus, Toyotamaphimeia and Hanyusuchus. Additionally a taxon only identified as cf. Rhamphosuchus sp. nov. (an unnamed new species) was found to be closely related to European forms like Gavialosuchus and "Tomistoma" lusitanica if a tomistomine or the sister taxon to the two named Rhamphosuchus species when found to be a gavialoid. When the same analysis is run without Portugalosuchus (a thoracosaur) the result becomes more consistent with molecular results, featuring a unified Gavialoidea including tomistomines, but the resulting tree becomes poorly resolved with most members of the group forming an enormous polytomy (an undesirable result in the field of cladistics). Meanwhile, extended implied weighting of phylogenetic characters once again recovers a result closer to older morphological studies with the species of Rhamphosuchus forming a paraphyletic grouping at the very base of Gavialoidea (not including tomistomines). Overall, the resulting trees are regarded as questionable, being incongruent with molecular data when recovering gavialoids and tomistomines as separate and being incongruent with stratigraphy and estimated divergence dates when featuring the Cretaceaous thoracosaurs as members of Gavialoidea in a more derived position than tomistomines.

In summary, the precise position of Rhamphosuchus within Gavialoidea remains uncertain.

Shown below are both alternate placements of Rhamphosuchus in the equally weighted trees (left and center) as well as the result of the tree recovered with implied extended weighting (right) of Courville et al. (2025).

- - Gavialoidea
    - †Eosuchus
    - - †Ocepesuchus
      - †Thoracosaurinae
      - - - †Aktiogavialis
          - †Argochampsa
        - - - †cf. Rhamphosuchus sp.
            - - †Rhamphosuchus pachyrhynchus
              - †Rhamphosuchus crassidens
          - - †Eogavialis
            - - †Gryposuchinae
              - - †Pseudogavialis curvirostris
                - - †Gavialis browni
                  - Gavialis gangeticus (Indian gharial)

- Tomistominae
  - †Maroccosuchus
  - - - †Kentisuchus astrei
      - †Kentisuchus spenceri
      - †Megadontosuchus arduini
    - - †Dollosuchoides
      - - †Melitosaurus
        - †Paratomistoma
        - Tomistoma schlegelii (False gharial)
        - †Maomingosuchus
        - - †"Tomistoma" coppensi
          - †"Tomistoma" cairense
        - - †Gavialosuchus
          - †"Tomistoma" lusitanica
          - - †cf. Rhamphosuchus sp. nov.
        - - †Hanyusuchus
          - †Toyotamaphimeia
          - †Penghusuchus
          - - †Rhamphosuchus pachyrhynchus
            - †Rhamphosuchus crassidens
        - - †Thecachampsa
          - - †"Tomistoma" gaudense
            - †"Tomistoma" calaritanum

- - Gavialoidea
    - †Portugalosuchus
    - - †Rhamphosuchus pachyrhynchus
      - - †Rhamphosuchus crassidens
        - - †cf. Rhamphosuchus sp. nov.
          - †Ocepesuchus
          - †Eosuchus
          - - †Eothoracosaurus
            - †Thoracosaurus
          - - - †Aktiogavialis
              - †Argochampsa
            - - †Eogavialis
              - - †Gryposuchinae
                - - †Pseudogavialis
                  - - †Gavialis browni
                    - Gavialis gangeticus (Indian gharial)

== Paleobiology ==
=== Gigantism ===
Even with the relatively reduced body lengths calculated by Jason Head as well as Courville and colleagues, Rhamphosuchus would still fall within a size range regarded to be gigantic among Crocodyliformes by Walter and colleagues. Such a size range has been attained several times within Crocodyliformes and is (at least in part) tied to favorable temperatures and a semi-aquatic lifestyle. Walter and colleagues hypothesize that in addition to these factors, gigantism in crocodyliforms is furthermore driven by the presence of geographically extensive marine or wetland biomes. Another factor in addition to simple geographic extent that would favor enormous crocodyliforms was a highly productive and structured ecosystem that also sustained other forms of megafauna. These factors would have been applicable to species of Rhamphosuchus and can also be observed in animals like the Mesozoic Sarcosuchus and Deinosuchus, and even including living saltwater crocodiles.

=== Ontogeny ===
The more numerous remains of Rhamphosuchus pachyrhynchus give some insight into the changes that members of the genus Rhamphosuchus undergo throughout their growth, or ontogeny. Judging from the ratio between the length across the first three maxillary teeth and the snout width, the latter seems to have increased much more rapidly. At the same time, the diameter of the alveoli and therefore the toothsize likewise increased faster than the distance between the tooth sockets, causing the teeth to effectively move closer together as the animal ages. For this reason, smaller and therefore younger specimens of Rhamphosuchus pachyrhynchus possess teeth that are much further apart, whereas larger and older specimen have the closely spaced teeth characteristic of the genus. Courville and colleagues note that though the distance between teeth decreases in the two modern gavialoids as well, they alveoli never grow as much as they do in Rhamphosuchus, nor do they ever come to be as tightly packed together.

=== Diet ===
Rhamphosuchus differs significantly from modern gharials in features such as the more heterodont dentition arranged in an alligator-like overbite, the close spacing of the individual teeth and the overall more robust proportions. These features would suggest that unlike modern gharials, whose widely spaced and interlocking teeth are used to catch fish, Rhamphosuchus likely preyed on much different prey, possibly being much more of a generalist predator. It is quite possible that Rhamphosuchus even attacked the other crocodilians it coexisted with, as Jason Head mentions the presence of bite marks on Miocene individuals of the genus Gavialis.

The fossil bones of several large-bodied Oligocene mammals from the Bugti Hills, such as chalicotheres and rhinocerotoids including juveniles of the enormous Paraceratherium, have been found with the clearly visible tooth marks of giant crocodilians. This clearly shows the predator-prey relationship between the local crocodilians and mammalian megafauna and could indicate that Rhamphosuchus may have preyed on these animals. However, bite marks alone do not allow for the precise identification of the attacker; ultimately, the inflictor of these marks are unknown, as Rhamphosuchus shared its environment with other tomistomines and Astorgosuchus.

== Palaeoenvironment ==
=== Bugti Hills ===
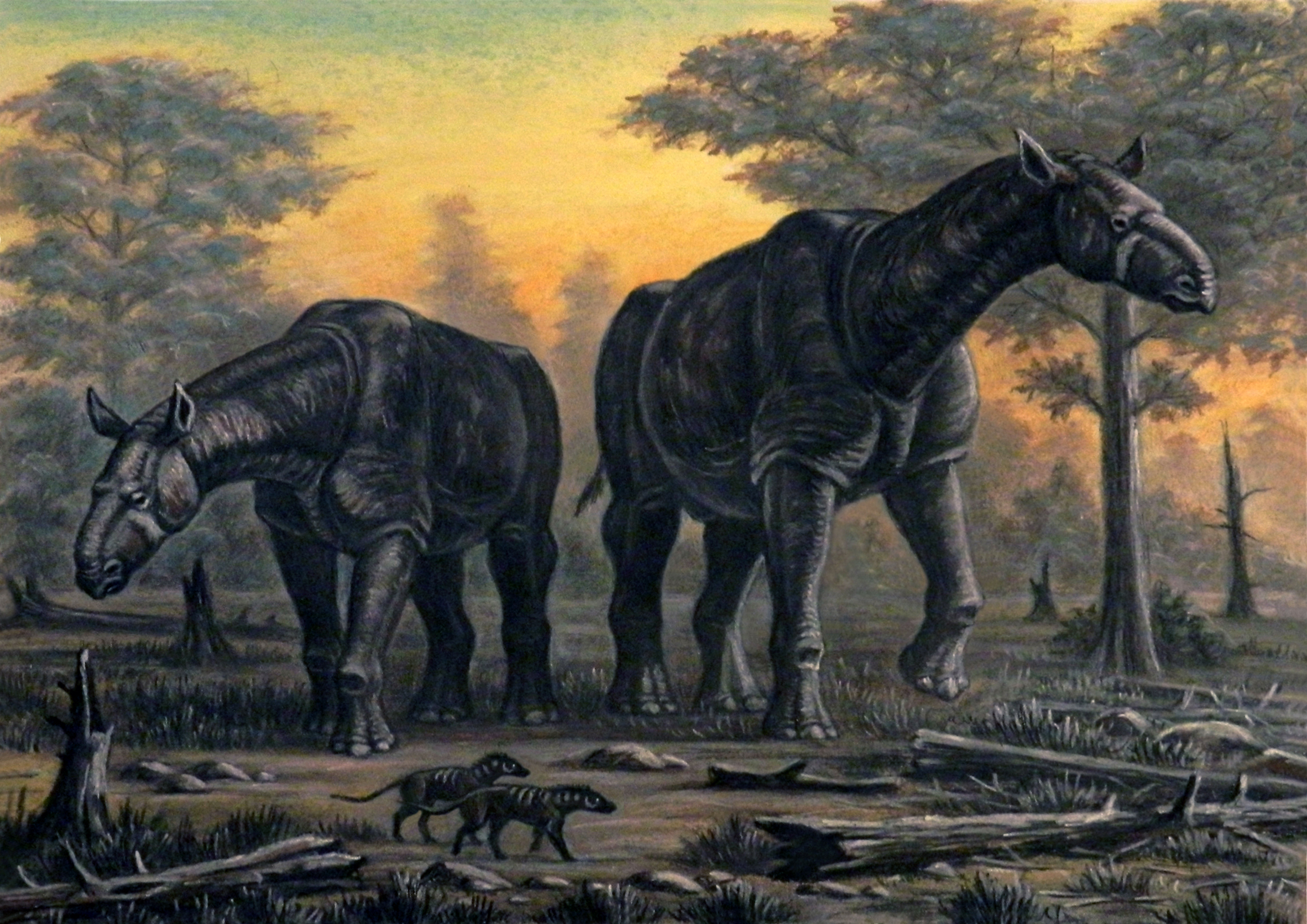
Paraceratherium was a common animal of the lower Chitarwata Formation. Bones of juvenile individuals bear the bitemarks of a large crocodilian.

Some of the oldest occurrences of the genus come in the form of Rhamphosuchus pachyrhynchus from the Oligocene to Miocene Chitarwata Formation of Pakistan's Bugti Hills. The Bugti Hills are well known for preserving the transition from older marine environments to the river systems that originated from the rising Himalayas, relating to the Proto-Indus, with the earliest sediments representing coastal environments, such as deltas and estuaries. Younger sediments within the Bugti Member suggest that the region would become part of a large network of meandering rivers and deltas within a floodplain, while the presence of dermopterans, chevrotain-like ruminants and primates suggests that the Chitarwata Formation was covered in part by tropical rainforests. The presence of tropical deciduous forests are also supported by isotope analysis of mammal teeth and the discovery of fossilized tree trunks. At the same time, the presence of animals such as Paraceratherium, entelodonts, and the bovid-like Palaeohypsodontus may indicate the presence of more open landscapes, suggesting a mosaic of tropical lowland forests and open environments. Fossil pollen tells a similar story, with Upper Oligocene records featuring both tropical ferns and members of Palmae as well as plants more indicative of drier open environments like birches and alders. Oxygen isotopes suggest a dry but densely forested temperate or subtropical environment with two periods of colder or more humid conditions. The Early Miocene would see the development of tropical humid rainforests, wetter than those of the Oligocene and possibly influenced by a monsoon-like weather system. Metais and colleagues propose that the Upper Chitarwata Formation also featured swampy conditions alongside the deltas already present previously.

Large and medium-sized mammals are represented by anthracotheres, which were especially diverse in the later parts of the formation, suoids, entelodonts, gelocids, early bovids and lophiomerycids. Early Miocene strata from the locality of Kumbi, where fossils of Rhamphosuchus have been found, also preserve the bones of the giraffid Bugtimeryx. In addition to these, the Bugti Hills are known for their abundant perissodactyl (odd-toed ungulate) remains, with chalicotheres being among the rarer members of the ecosystem. Rhinocerotoids are much more common and diverse, constituting the most abundantly present group of large mammals from the Chitarwata Formation. The group is represented by amynodontids, the enormous paraceratheriid Paraceratherium, crown rhinocerotines, elasmotheriines, and aceratheriines. Even early proboscideans were found within the Chitarwata Formation, eventually leading to the replacement of paraceratheriids with deinotheres during the Oligocene-Miocene faunal turnover.

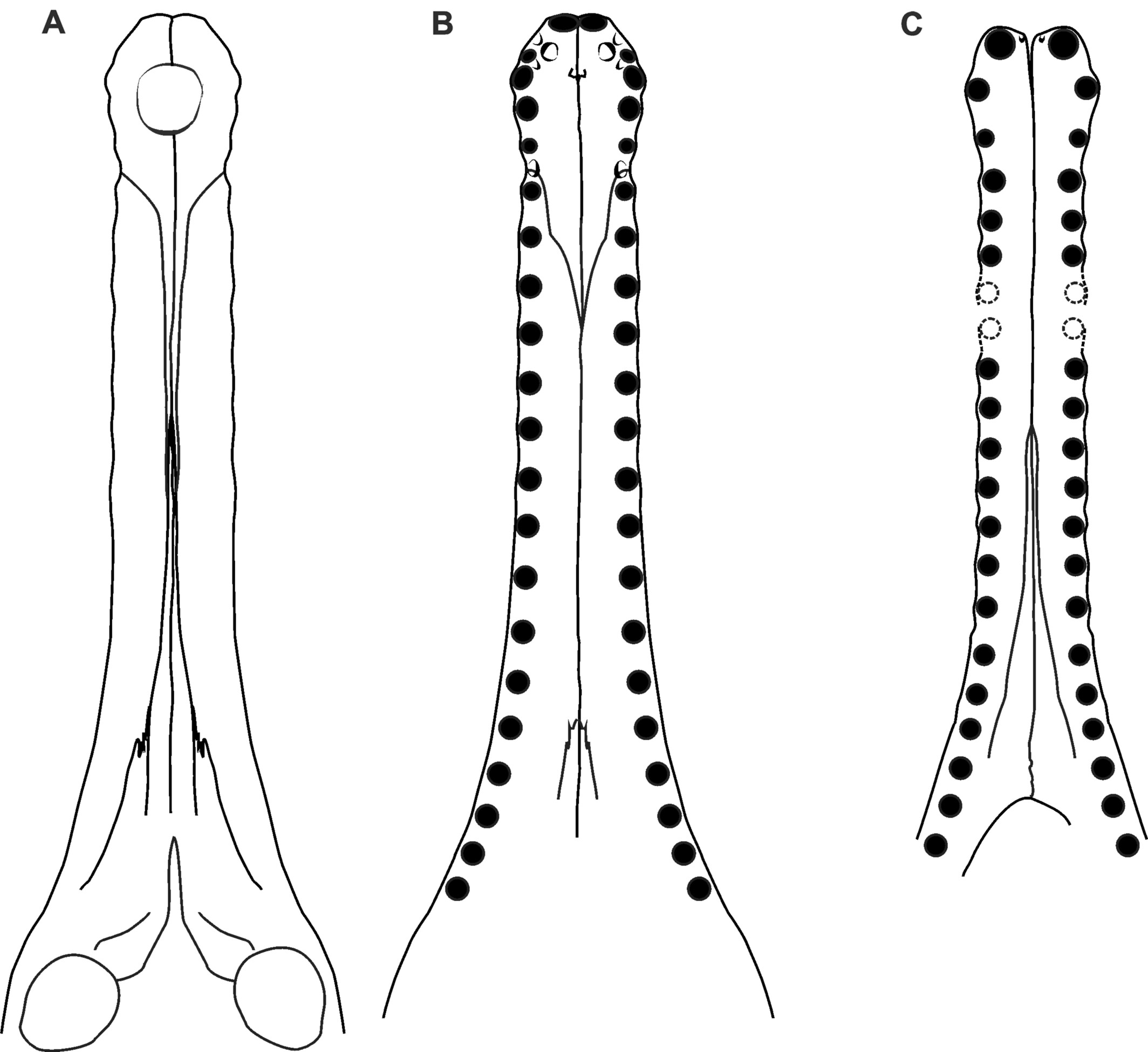
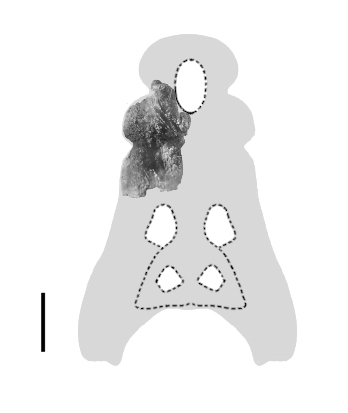
Two other large crocodilians were found within the Bugti Hills, the slender-snouted Pseudogavialis and the robust Astorgosuchus.

Rhamphosuchus pachyrhynchus was not the only crocodilian to inhabit the waterways of the Chitarwata Formation. Among the others was Pseudogavialis, a similarly large but more slender-snouted gavialoid more closely related to today's Indian gharials. Though superficially similar, Pseudogavialis has teeth much more uniform and interlocking dentition, therefore likely filling a different nische from the more generalist Rhamphosuchus. Astorgosuchus on the other hand is a much more robust, albeit poorly understood, crocodyloid exclusively known from the Oligocene sediments of the Chitarwata Formation. With a similar size range to Rhamphosuchus and a skull shape closer to modern crocodilians, Astorgosuchus was likely another large generalist predator and would have been able to prey on megafaunal mammals like Paraceratherium, though the tooth marks on fossils of the latter could have also been left by Rhamphosuchus.

=== Siwalik Hills ===
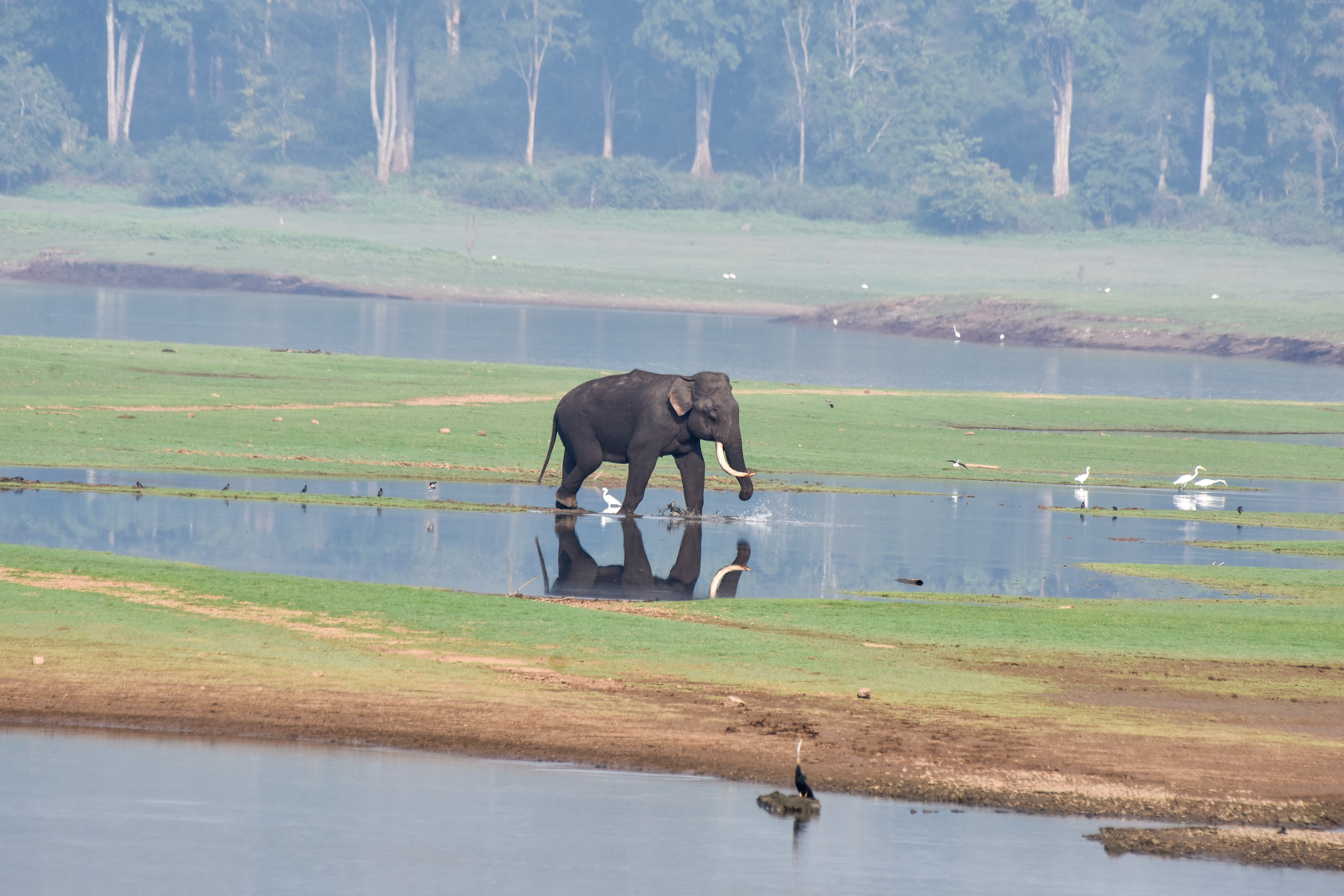
By the Pliocene the Indian subcontinent experienced considerable changes in climate and flora, leading to a more open grassland environment.

Both Rhamphosuchus pachyrhynchus and Pseudogavialis are also known to co-occur (sympatry) in the sediments of the Laki Hills of Sindh, part of the lower Siwaliks, which are considered to be Oligocene to Miocene in age by Courville et al. and Middle Miocene by Jeremy E. Martin and may correspond to the Chinji Formation. The Laki Hills also preserve fossil material of Crocodylus palaeindicus.

Following the tropical closed-canopy rainforests of the middle Miocene Siwaliks, the Indian subcontinent trainsitioned into an increasingly drier and seasonal climate. While the large river systems persisted, continuing to accommodate for Rhamphosuchus and other large crocodilians, grasslands became increasingly more prevalent during this period. Mammals such as equoids began to incorporate C4 plants into their diet as C3 plants declined in number, though rhinos and proboscideans remained primarily browsers showing that woodlands continued to persist.

Remains of Rhamphosuchus crassidens are known from the Pliocene (3.6 to 2.6 Ma) of India's Chandigarh region, originating from the Tatrot Beds of the Saketi Formation (sometimes also attributed to the Tatrot Formation or Dhamala Formation). Like older sediments that yielded Rhamphosuchus, those of Chandigarh represent a floodplain environment with low sinuosity streams. Study of carbon isotopes from the Tatrot Beds near the Ghaggar River suggests the presence of both C3 and C4 plants, with the majority of samples indicating that grasslands were the dominant terrestrial biome with occasional pockets of mixed vegetation during the timeframe when Rhamphosuchus was present. From the Late Pliocene to Early Pleistocene the region experienced a warm and dry climate with the environment having been inhabited by a vast range of mammals including elephants such as Stegodon and Elephas, horses, camels, deer, gazelles, the hippo Hexaprotodon, and baboons, with many of them having been grazers. The gavialoid Gavialis leptodus may also come from the Pliocene sediments at Chandigarh, but it's also possible that it comes from the Pleistocene Pinjor Formation. Remains similar to the modern mugger crocodile have also been mentioned to come from the Tatrot beds, though later studies have argued that this species is not unequivocally known from before the Pleistocene. Following the deposition of the Tatrot Beds, the region experienced a cooling and drying of the climate and Rajan Gaur notes that turtle, crocodilian, and even hippo remains become rarer in the younger Pinjor Formation.

=== Kutch ===
Rhamphosuchus pachyrhynchus is also known to occur in the Lower Miocene aged Khari Nadi Formation of western India according to Courville and collegeous.

Fossils of indeterminate whales, a small mustelid Matanomictis, sirenians like Kutchisiren, Bharatisiren, Domningia and Kharisiren, aswell as sharks like the Hemipristis serra and Otodus chubutensis are known to occur in the marine deposits of the formation. The terrestrial ecosystem was dominated by various proboscideans like gomphotheres and deinotheres, aswell as ungulates like anthracotheres, rhinocerotids, suids, giraffids, and tragulids.
