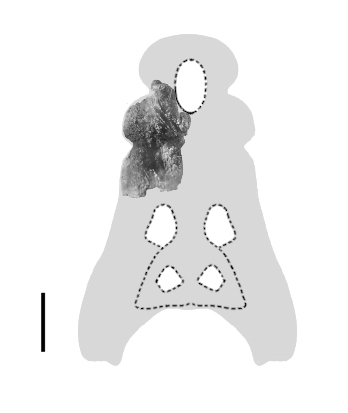
- Astorgosuchus skull

Scientific classification
- Kingdom: Animalia
- Phylum: Chordata
- Class: Reptilia
- Order: Crocodylia
- Family: incertae sedis
- Genus: †Astorgosuchus; Martin et al., 2019

Type species
- Astorgosuchus bugtiensis (Pilgrim, 1908)

Synonyms
- Crocodylus bugtiensis Pilgrim, 1908

= Astorgosuchus =

Astorgosuchus Temporal range: Late Oligocene, 27.82–23.03 Ma

Extinct genus of reptiles

Astorgosuchus is an extinct monospecific genus of crocodilian, closely related to true crocodiles, that lived in Bugti Hills of Balochistan, Pakistan during the late Oligocene period. This crocodile may have reached lengths of up to 7–8 m (23–26 ft) and is known to have preyed on many of the large mammals found in its environment. Bite marks of a large crocodile have been found on the bones of juvenile Paraceratherium, however if these were left by Astorgosuchus cannot be said with certainty. The genus contains a single species, Astorgosuchus bugtiensis, which was originally named as a species of Crocodylus in 1908 and was moved to its own genus in 2019.

== Discovery and naming ==
The earliest described crocodilian remains from the Bugti Hills of Pakistan were described by G. E. Pilgrim in 1908 and 1912. Among these remains were those of large tomistomines and a broad-snouted crocodylomorph of exceptional size first named "Crocodylus" bugtiensis in 1908. These remains, holotype specimen IM E221, consisted of a left maxilla with assorted cranial fragments discovered at Pishi Nala, formally described in 1912 and housed in Indian Museum, Kolkata. A precise stratigraphical identification for the holotype is not possible. Further remains were discovered in Baluchistan in the 1920s and presented by Clive Foster-Cooper to the Natural History Museum, London in 1925. Foster-Cooper claimed the fossil was collected from Miocene strata, however he was unable to provide details on the precise locality and horizon, leaving his assessment uncertain. Later K. N. Prasad reported a maxilla fragment from Late Miocene aged Piram Island of western India, which is geologically younger than the fossils from Bugti Hills, however Nils Chabrol and collegeous in 2024 considered this specimen to be an indeterminate crocodyloid. In addition to this specimen (NHMUK R.5266), another mandible was discovered between 1995 and 2000, given the specimen number UM-DB-LCJ1-02. This specimen, a mandibular symphysis, was collected as part of the "Mission Paléontologique Française au Baloutchistan" (MPFB) from well-identified late Oligocene strata south of Zin Anticline. In 2019, Martin et al. created the genus Astorgosuchus. Although there is no overlap between the holotype and the referred material, Martin et al. consider the specimen to be part of the same genus on account of the remarkably large size and robust morphology as well as the fact that both the maxillary and dentary teeth show the same marks of occlusion.

The name Astorgosuchus derives from the Greek "Astorgos", meaning merciless or inexorable, and "Souchos", meaning crocodile. The species name refers to the Bugti Hills of Pakistan.

== Description ==
Based on the cranial remains, Astorgosuchus is inferred to have been a large bodied, blunt-snouted crocodyloid. The skull length has been estimated to be around 80 to 91 cm for UM-DB-LCJ1-01 and NHMUK R.5266, respectively. These estimates were the result of a regression equation based on 13 living species of the genus Crocodylus, based on the width of the mandible at the level of the largest dentary alveoli. Modern crocodilians have a head to body ratio of 1:7, with older individuals having proportionally bigger bodies with a ratio of 1:8. Based on the estimated skull length Martin, et al. estimated Astorgosuchus specimens UM-DB-LCJ1-01 and NHMUK R.5266 to have reached a total body length of 6.4 to 7.3 meters, respectively. When using the proportions of the largest known saltwater crocodile individuals (1:8.8), this would result in a total body length of 7 to 8 meters, respectively. While those estimates should be treated with caution due to the lack of postcranial remains or even complete crania, the resulting estimates would be in line with sizes obtained by a variety of prehistoric crocodilian genera.

Astorgosuchus had a short and broad snout, being only twice as long as wide. The 5th maxillary tooth is the biggest tooth of the maxilla. The rostrum appears constricted due to a notch present between the premaxilla and maxilla that would accommodate the enlarged 11th dentary tooth when the jaws are closed. The external nares extend much further posteriorly than in modern crocodilians, reaching as far back as the enlarged 5th maxillary tooth. The nasal bone contributes to the nares and the skull preserves swollen and rugose (wrinkled) prominences located on the lacrimals, premaxillae and the anterior portion of the nasal. The lacrimals do not contribute to the orbital margins.

The mandibular symphysis encompasses the first seven dentary alveoli. The lateral surface of the dentary is profusely ornamented with deep circular foramina which continue on the ventral surface, however more sparsely and larger in size. The mandibular rostrum is slightly longer than wide, giving it a spoon-like shape. The splenials are fused and penetrate the mandibular rostrum up to the level of the 6th dentary alveoli. All dentary alveoli are nearly circular in shape, with the 1st dentary tooth being procumbent and anteriodorsally oriented. The 3rd, 4th and 5th dentary teeth are contiguous with the 4th being the largest dentary tooth followed by a diminutive 5th dentary tooth.

== Phylogeny ==
Although the phylogenetic placement of Astorgosuchus within Crocodylia was not a focal point of the 2019 study, Martin et al. nevertheless discuss several features and their implications for the taxon's relationships within the group. Notably, the fact that the splenial is involved in the mandibular symphysis differentiates Astorgosuchus from members of Crocodylinae and Mekosuchinae, while the shortened morphology of the rostrum sets it apart from tomistomines. Astorgosuchus most closely resembles Asiatosuchus germanicus, a basal crocodyloid from the Eocene. In Asiatosuchus germanicus, the splenials are slightly involved in the mandibular symphysis, however not to as great of a degree as in Astorgosuchus.

== Paleobiology ==
During the Oligocene, the area Astorgosuchus was found in was a fluvial lacustrine environment it shared with members of Rhinocerotoidea, Chalicotheriinae, Anthracotheriidae and proboscideans. One notable rhinocerotoid of the area was Paraceratherium bugtiense which may have been preyed upon by Astorgosuchus. One particular fossil preserves the lower jaw of a juvenile Paraceratherium with the tooth marks of a large crocodyloid. However, it is hard to determine whether or not the attacker was Astorgosuchus or one of the other native crocodilians. Given the size of adult Paraceratherium specimens, it is likely that Astorgosuchus would have preyed on juvenile and sick or injured individuals.

Another crocodyloid known from the area is "Gavialis" breviceps, originally described by Pilgrim in 1912 as a member of the genus Gavialis. More recent examination of the fossils suggests that it was instead a member of Tomistominae, possibly a relative of Rhamphosuchus or another distinct tomistomine genus. However, further research on this matter is needed. It is likely that while inhabiting the same streams, Astorgosuchus and "Gavialis" breviceps would have inhabited different niches in a way seen in the gharials and mugger crocodiles in modern India.
