= Sacacosuchus =

Sacacosuchus Temporal range: Miocene (Colhuehuapian-Huayquerian) 19–6.33 Ma
- Skull diagram

Scientific classification
- Kingdom: Animalia
- Phylum: Chordata
- Class: Reptilia
- Order: Crocodylia
- Family: Gavialidae
- Genus: †Sacacosuchus; Salas-Gismondi et al., 2022
- Species: †S. cordovai

Binomial name
- †Sacacosuchus cordovai Salas-Gismondi et al., 2022

Extinct genus of crocodylians

Sacacosuchus is an extinct monospecific genus of marine gavialid that lived along the coast of the south-east Pacific from approximately 19 to 6.3 million years ago. Its fossils have been found in the Chilcatay and Pisco Formations of Peru, where it coexisted with the much larger Piscogavialis. Based on its skull, Sacacosuchus was most likely a generalist feeder. Its extinction is thought to have been caused by a combination of factors including falling sea levels and global cooling.

== History and naming ==
Sacacosuchus is known from several adult to juvenile specimens mostly stemming from the Sacaco locality of the Pisco Formation. The holotype represents a nearly complete skull, while some of the referred specimens include partial skulls and dentary bones. Other material was found in the Ica-Pisco Valley and the older Chilcatay Formation.

The generic name derives from the Sacaco area of the Pisco Basin and the Greek "suchus" meaning crocodile. The species name honors professor Jesús Córdova for his work on the paleontology of Peru.

== Description ==
size comparison

Sacacosuchus was a medium-sized gavialoid with a longirostrine skull as typical for the group. The transition from the maxilla to the premaxilla is smooth, with the latter bone not expanding outward as in some other gavialids, including the modern Indian gharial. The margin of the rostrum remains parallel without notable constrictions that would give it a wavy appearance, however it does expand gradually towards the orbital region. The tooth row itself is however slightly sinuous and the rostrum appears to curve slightly upwards in sideview. The proportions between the rostrum and the total skull length is similar to that of modern gharials, however Sacacosuchus differs more significantly in the relative width of the skull. The difference in width between the rostrum and the skull behind the eyes is notably less drastic in this genus than it is in Indian gharials, Tomistoma or the contemporary Piscogavialis, instead more resembling the proportions of thoracosaurs. The nasal bone extends between the premaxillae and contacts the external nares, which open dorsally and resemble an elongated heart. Each premaxilla contains five teeth followed by fourteen maxillary teeth, the fifth as well as the ninth to twelfth of which being enlarged. The ninth to twelfth are the largest alveoli in the skull. The orbits are enlarged and circular in shape with a low-set ventral margin which is barrel vault-shaped. Unlike many modern crocodiles, the edges or the orbits which are formed by the prefrontal bones, frontal bone and lacrimal bones are not raised. The skull table is more rectangular than it is circular with wide supratemporal fenestrae, whose border is overhung by the skull table. Towards the back, where the skull table is made up of the squamosal, its surface slopes much like it does in Gryposuchus and Paratomistoma. When observing the postorbital bar, it is slender and lanceolate in cross-section and facing to the front and sides. The quadratojugal composes most of the lower boundary of the infratemporal fenestra, but does not contact its posterior margin. The dentary contained approximately seventeen to eighteen teeth. The dentary symphysis extends to the ninth mandibular teeth where the bone contacts the deep splenial symphysis.

== Phylogeny ==
Salas-Gismondi and colleagues conducted both Bayesian and maximum-parsimony analysis based on the morphological characteristics of gavialoids to determine the phylogenetic position of Sacacosuchus. Their analysis recovered traditional tomistomines as basal members within Gavialoidea, with Sacacosuchus nesting in a more derived position than Tomistoma, yet notably more basal than Piscogavialis, which it shared its habitat with. It forms a polytomy alongside the also marine Gavialosuchus (Europe), Thecachampsa (North America), and a large clade that contains most derived gavialids, including the bulk of South American forms. All this suggests that Sacacosuchus, Aktiogavialis and gryposuchines had independent origins.

- - Crocodyloidea
  - Gavialoidea
    - †Kentisuchus spenceri
    - - †Dollosuchoides densmorei
      - - †Maroccosuchus zennaroi
        - - †Maomingosuchus petrolica
          - Gavialidae
            - Tomistoma schlegelii, false gharial
            - - †Tomistoma lusitanicum
              - - †Gavialosuchus eggenburgensis
                - †Sacacosuchus cordovai
                - - †Thecachampsa antiqua
                  - - †Thecachampsa carolinensis
                    - †Thecachampsa americana
                - - - †Tomistoma dowsoni
                    - †Tomistoma coppensi
                  - - †Tomistoma cairense
                    - - †Paratomistoma courti
                      - - †MUSM 1513
                        - - †Argochampsa krebsi
                          - - †Aktiogavialis caribesi
                            - †Aktiogavialis puertoricensis
                          - - - †Eogavialis
                              - - †Gavialis bengawanicus
                                - Gavialis gangeticus, gharial
                                - †Siwalik Gavialis
                            - - †Siquisiquesuchus venezuelensis
                              - - †Piscogavialis jugaliperforatus
                                - - †Ikanogavialis gameroi
                                  - †Dadagavialis gunai
                                - - †Gryposuchus pachakamue
                                  - - †Gryposuchus neogaeus
                                    - - †Gryposuchus croizati
                                      - †Gryposuchus colombianus

== Paleobiology ==
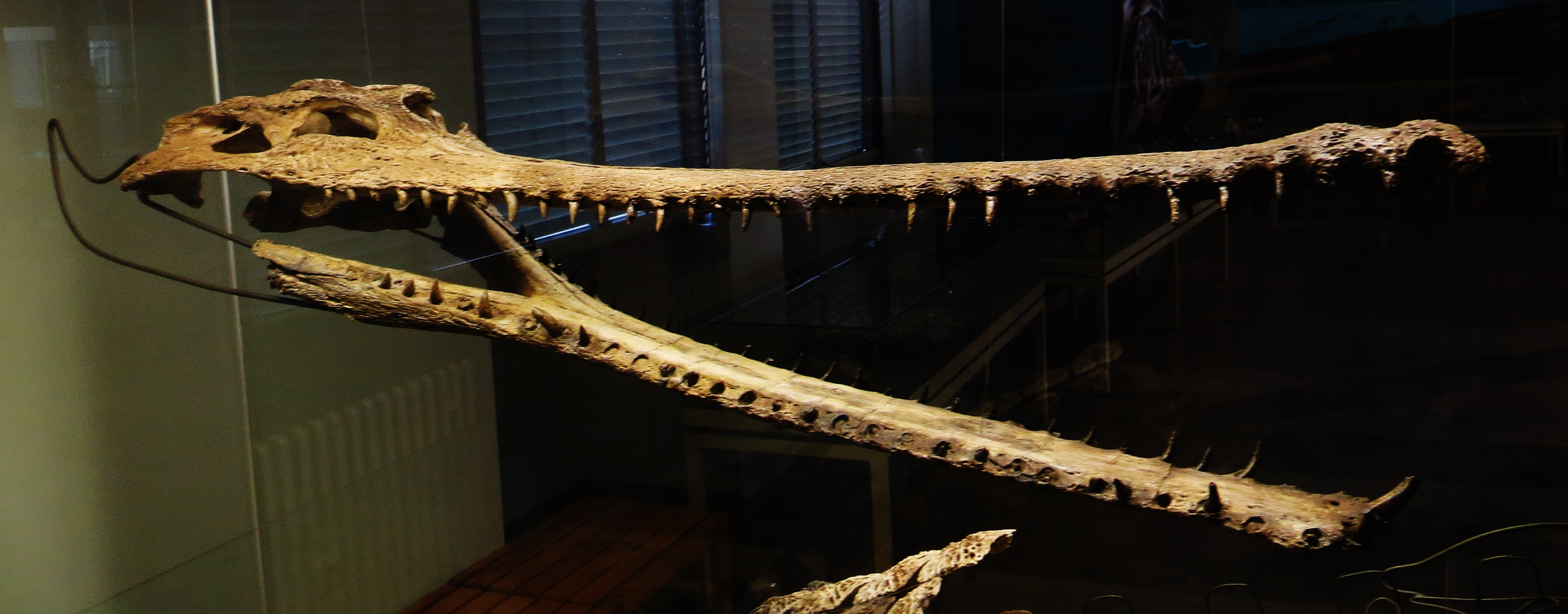
Although much larger, Piscogavialis was likely specialised in smaller prey than Sacacosuchus

During the Miocene, what is now the Pisco Basin in Peru was largely covered by a shallow marine transgression that connected to the open ocean. The environment was marked by shallow waters, protected bays with rocky shores and small islands. The south-east Pacific coast was inhabited by at least two species of crocodilians, Sacacosuchus and Piscogavialis, throughout most of this time period. The remains of both species were found alongside other animals typical for the marine environments of this region including various cetaceans, seals, seabirds, marine sloths and sharks. As the Peruvian sediments yielded bones of both adults and juvenile specimens, it is assumed that Sacacosuchus spent its entire life in saltwater. Although Piscogavialis was notably larger, it was also likely more specialized, feeding primarily on fast fish. Sacacosuchus, meanwhile, in spite of being only half the length of its contemporary relative, was adapted to a more generalist diet.

During the Miocene, environmental factors worked together to highly favor marine gavialoids, in particular warm temperatures and abundant shallow water coastal environments suited to their lifestyle. Subsequently, their diversity was high during most of this time period with their range extending as far south as Chile. However, despite these initially favorable conditions, global temperatures continuously dropped throughout the late Neogene. Initially, both Sacacosuchus and Piscogavialis weren't heavily affected, with the water temperatures of their habitat continuing to support these ectotherms until at least the end of the Miocene period. Eventually, however, the extinction of Peru's marine gavialids was brought on by the disruption of these coastal ecosystems, caused by dropping sea levels and the uplifting of the Andes Mountains, coupled with the more drastically dropping global temperatures of the Pliocene.
