= List of crocodilians =

Species in reptile order Crocodilia

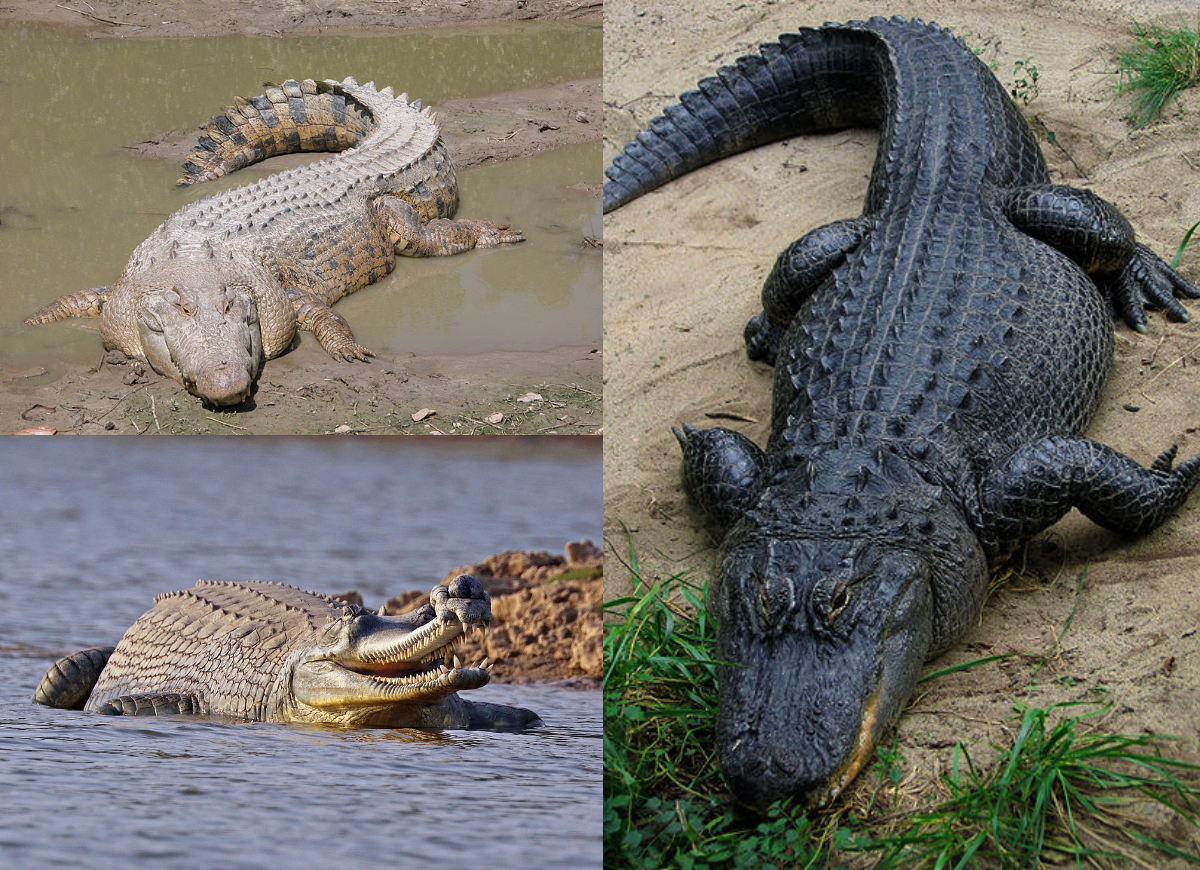
Three extant crocodilian species clockwise from top-left: saltwater crocodile (Crocodylus porosus), American alligator (Alligator mississippiensis), and gharial (Gavialis gangeticus)

Crocodilia is an order of mostly large, predatory, semiaquatic reptiles, which includes true crocodiles, the alligators, and caimans; as well as the gharial and false gharial. A member of this order is called a crocodilian, or colloquially a crocodile.

The 9 genera and 26 species of Crocodilia are split into 3 families: Alligatoridae, alligators and caimans; Crocodylidae, true crocodiles; and Gavialidae, the gharial and false gharial.

== Conventions ==
IUCN Red List categories
Conservation status
- EX: Extinct (0 species)
- EW: Extinct in the wild (0 species)
- CR: Critically endangered (7 species)
- EN: Endangered (1 species)
- VU: Vulnerable (3 species)
- NT: Near threatened (0 species)
- LC: Least concern (12 species)

Other categories
- DD: Data deficient (0 species)
- NE: Not evaluated (3 species)

Conservation status codes listed follow the International Union for Conservation of Nature (IUCN) Red List of Threatened Species. Range maps are provided wherever possible; if a range map is not available, a description of the crocodilian's range is provided. Ranges are based on the IUCN red list for that species unless otherwise noted. All extinct species or subspecies listed alongside extant species went extinct after 1500 CE, and are indicated by a dagger symbol "†". Population figures are rounded to the nearest hundred.

== Classification ==
The order Crocodilia consists of 26 extant species belonging to 9 genera. This does not include hybrid species or extinct prehistoric species. Modern molecular studies indicate that the 9 genera can be grouped into 3 families.

Family Alligatoridae (Alligators and caimans)

- Genus Alligator: two species
- Genus Caiman: three species
- Genus Melanosuchus: one species
- Genus Paleosuchus: two species

Family Crocodylidae (True crocodiles)

- Genus Crocodylus: fourteen species
- Genus Mecistops: two species
- Genus Osteolaemus: two species

Family Gavialidae (Gharial and false gharial)

- Genus Gavialis: one species
- Genus Tomistoma: one species

== Crocodilians ==
=== Family Alligatoridae ===
The extant Alligatoridae can be recognised by the broad snout, in which the fourth tooth of the lower jaw cannot be seen when the mouth is closed.

Genus Alligator – Cuvier, 1807 – two species
Common name	Scientific name and subspecies	Range	Size and ecology	IUCN status and estimated population
American alligator	A. mississippiensis Daudin, 1801	Southeastern United States	Size: up to 450 kg (990 lb) Habitat: Wetlands (inland), intertidal marine, and coastal marine Diet:	LC 3,000,000-4,000,000
Chinese alligator	A. sinensis Fauvel, 1879	Eastern China	Size: up to 45 kg (99 lb) Habitat: Inland wetlands Diet:	CR 136–173

Genus Caiman – Spix, 1825 – three species
Common name	Scientific name and subspecies	Range	Size and ecology	IUCN status and estimated population
Spectacled caiman	C. crocodilus Linnaeus, 1758	Northern South America and Central America	Size: up to 45 kg (99 lb) Habitat: Forest, savanna, shrubland, grassland, and inland wetlands Diet:	LC 1,000,000
Broad-snouted caiman	C. latirostris Daudin, 1802	Southeastern South America	Size: up to 50 kg (110 lb) Habitat: Inland wetlands and intertidal marine Diet:	LC 500,000
Yacare caiman	C. yacare Daudin, 1802	Central and southern South America	Size: up to 60 kg (130 lb) Habitat: Inland wetlands Diet:	LC 2,000,000 - 5,000,000

Genus Melanosuchus – Gray, 1862 – one species
Common name	Scientific name and subspecies	Range	Size and ecology	IUCN status and estimated population
Black caiman	M. niger Spix, 1825	Northern South America	Size: up to 500 kg (1,100 lb) Habitat: Diet:	LC 10,000 ▲

Genus Paleosuchus – Gray, 1862 – two species
Common name	Scientific name and subspecies	Range	Size and ecology	IUCN status and estimated population
Cuvier's dwarf caiman	P. palpebrosus Cuvier, 1807	Northern and central South America	Size: typically 6–7 kg (13–15 lb) Habitat: Inland wetlands Diet:	LC Unknown
Smooth-fronted caiman	P. trigonatus Schneider, 1801	Northern South America	Size: typically 9–20 kg (20–44 lb) Habitat: Forest and inland wetlands Diet:	LC Unknown

=== Family Crocodylidae ===
The extant Crocodylidae have a variety of snout shapes, but can be recognised because the fourth tooth of the lower jaw is visible when the mouth is closed.

Genus Crocodylus – Laurenti, 1768 – fourteen species
Common name	Scientific name and subspecies	Range	Size and ecology	IUCN status and estimated population
American crocodile	C. acutus Cuvier, 1807	Northern South America, Central America, Greater Antilles	Size: up to 500 kg (1,100 lb) Habitat: Forest, neritic marine, intertidal marine, and coastal marine Diet:	VU 5,000
Orinoco crocodile	C. intermedius Graves, 1819	Northern South America	Size: up to 635 kg (1,400 lb) Habitat: Forest, savanna, and inland wetlands Diet:	CR 90–250
Freshwater crocodile	C. johnstoni Krefft, 1873	Northern Australia	Size: up to 100 kg (220 lb) Habitat: Inland wetlands Diet:	LC Unknown
Philippine crocodile	C. mindorensis Schmidt, 1935	Philippines	Size: up to 90 kg (200 lb) Habitat: Inland wetlands Diet:	CR 92–137
Morelet's crocodile	C. moreletii Duméril, 1851	Eastern Mexico	Size: up to 150 kg (330 lb) Habitat: Inland wetlands Diet:	LC 79,000–100,000
Nile crocodile	C. niloticus Laurenti, 1768	Sub-Saharan Africa and Nile Valley	Size: up to 750 kg (1,650 lb) Habitat: Inland wetlands, neritic marine, intertidal marine, and coastal marine Diet:	LC 50,000 - 70,000
New Guinea crocodile	C. novaeguineae Schmidt, 1928	New Guinea	Size: up to 200 kg (440 lb) Habitat: Inland wetlands Diet:	LC 100,000
Mugger crocodile	C. palustris Lesson, 1831	Southern Asia	Size: up to 400 kg (880 lb) Habitat: Inland wetlands and neritic marine Diet:	VU 5,700–8,700
Saltwater crocodile	C. porosus Schneider, 1801	South and Southeast Asia, northern Australia and Oceania	Size: up to 1,000 kg (2,200 lb) Habitat: Diet:	LC 500,000
Cuban crocodile	C. rhombifer Cuvier, 1807	Cuba	Size: up to 215 kg (474 lb) Habitat: Inland wetlands Diet:	CR 2,400 ▼
Siamese crocodile	C. siamensis Schneider, 1801	Southeast Asia	Size: up to 120 kg (260 lb) Habitat: Inland wetlands Diet:	CR 500–1,000
West African crocodile	C. suchus Geoffroy, 1807	Western and central Africa	Size: Habitat: Diet:	NE Unknown

Genus Mecistops – Gray, 1844 – two species
Common name	Scientific name and subspecies	Range	Size and ecology	IUCN status and estimated population
West African slender-snouted crocodile	M. cataphractus F. Cuvier, 1825	Western Africa	Size: up to 325 kg (717 lb) Habitat: Forest, savanna, inland wetlands, neritic marine, and coastal marine Diet:	CR 1,000–20,000
Central African slender-snouted crocodile	M. leptorhynchus Bennett, 1835	Central Africa	Size: Habitat: Diet:	NE Unknown

Genus Osteolaemus – Cope, 1861 – two species
Common name	Scientific name and subspecies	Range	Size and ecology	IUCN status and estimated population
Osborn's dwarf crocodile	O. osborni Schmidt, 1919	Congo Basin	Size: Habitat: Diet:	NE Unknown
Dwarf crocodile	O. tetraspis Cope, 1861	Western Africa	Size: Habitat: Diet:	VU Unknown

=== Family Gavialidae ===
Gavialidae can be recognised by the long narrow snout, with an enlarged boss at the tip.

Genus Gavialis – Oppel, 1811 – one species
Common name	Scientific name and subspecies	Range	Size and ecology	IUCN status and estimated population
Gharial	G. gangeticus Gmelin, 1789	Scattered south Asia	Size: up to 680 kg (1,500 lb) Habitat: Wetlands (inland) Diet:	CR 300–900

Genus Tomistoma – Müller, 1846 – one species
Common name	Scientific name and subspecies	Range	Size and ecology	IUCN status and estimated population
False gharial	T. schlegelii Müller, 1838	Southeast Asia	Size: up to 270 kg (600 lb) Habitat: Forest and inland wetlands Diet:	EN 2,400
