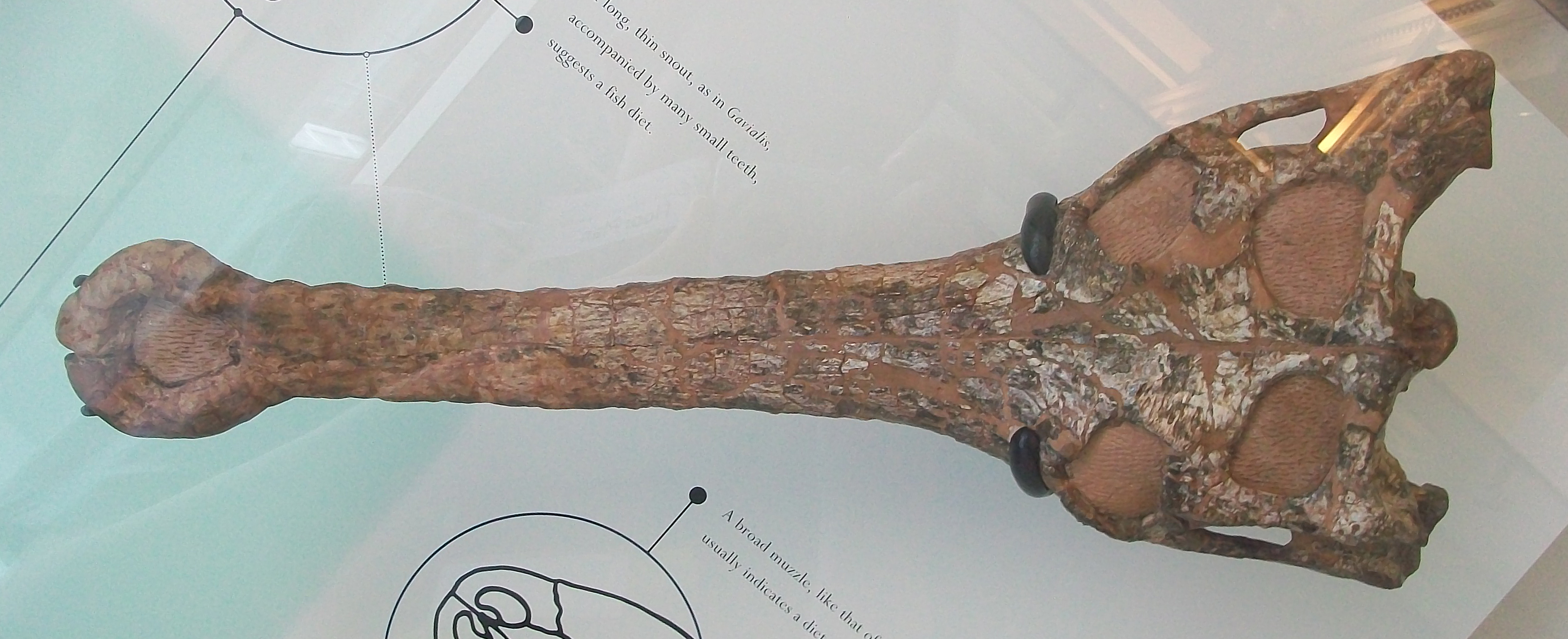
- Skull of Gavialis browni (AMNH 6279) in the American Museum of Natural History

Scientific classification
- Kingdom: Animalia
- Phylum: Chordata
- Class: Reptilia
- Order: Crocodilia
- Family: Gavialidae
- Genus: Gavialis
- Species: †G. browni

Binomial name
- †Gavialis browni Mook 1932

= Gavialis browni =

Gavialis browni Temporal range: Late Miocene, 11.6–5.3 Ma

Extinct species of reptile

Gavialis browni is an extinct species of the crocodylian genus Gavialis and a close relative of the living gharial Gavialis gangeticus.

G. browni lived about 5 million years ago in the Sivalik Hills of Pakistan. G. browni can be distinguished from G. gangeticus by its more closely spaced eyes and a narrower frontal bone. The species was named in 1932 by paleontologist Charles Mook. Mook described it as a transitional form between the most primitive Gavialis species, Gavialis dixoni, and the most advanced, the modern gharial (although G. dixoni is now placed outside Gavialis in its own genus, Dollosuchus, and may be more closely related to crocodiles than to the gharial). G. browni has a longer snout with more teeth than Dollosuchus, but it is not as long and does not have as many teeth as that of the gharial. G. browni has also been proposed to be moved to a genus other than Gavialis.

== Phylogyny ==
Below is a cladogram that shows the proposed phylogeny within Gavialidae, including extinct members:

- Gavialidae
  - - - - - - - - Gavialis gangeticus Gharial
                - Gavialis bengawanicus†
              - Gavialis browni†
            - Gryposuchus colombianus†
          - Ikanogavialis†
        - - Gryposuchus pachakamue†
          - Piscogavialis†
      - Harpacochampsa†
    - - - Toyotamaphimeia†
        - Penghusuchus†
      - Gavialosuchus†
  - - Tomistoma lusitanicum†
    - Tomistoma schlegelii False gharial
