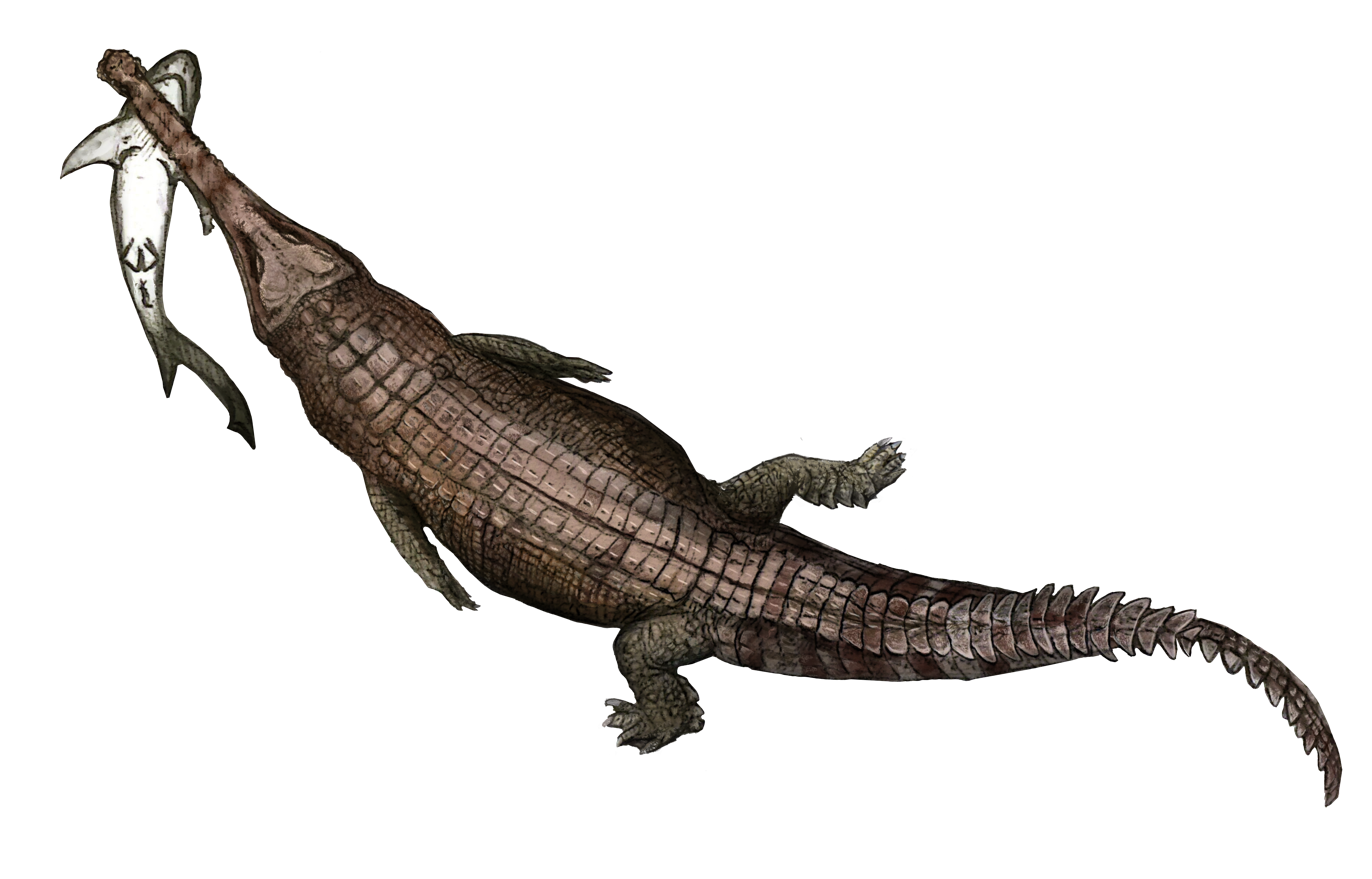
- Life restoration of G. pachakamue

Scientific classification
- Kingdom: Animalia
- Phylum: Chordata
- Class: Reptilia
- Order: Crocodylia
- Family: Gavialidae
- Subfamily: †Gryposuchinae
- Genus: †Gryposuchus; Gurich, 1912

Type species
- †Gryposuchus jessei Gurich, 1912

Other species
- †G. neogaeus (Burmeister, 1885 [originally Rhamphostomopsis neogaeus]); †G. colombianus Langston, 1965; †G. croizati Riff & Aguilera, 2008; †G. pachakamue Salas-Gismondi et al., 2016

= Gryposuchus =

Gryposuchus Temporal range: Miocene, 16–5.3 Ma
- Skull diagram of the different species within the genus

Extinct genus of gavialoid crocodilian

Gryposuchus (meaning "hooked crocodile") is an extinct genus of gavialid crocodilian. Fossils have been found from Argentina, Colombia, Venezuela, Brazil and the Peruvian Amazon. The genus existed during the Miocene epoch (Colhuehuapian to Huayquerian). One species described in 2008, G. croizati, grew to an estimated length of 10 metres (33 ft). Gryposuchus is the type genus of the subfamily Gryposuchinae, although a 2018 study indicates that Gryposuchinae and Gryposuchus might be paraphyletic and rather an evolutionary grade towards the gharial.

== Species ==
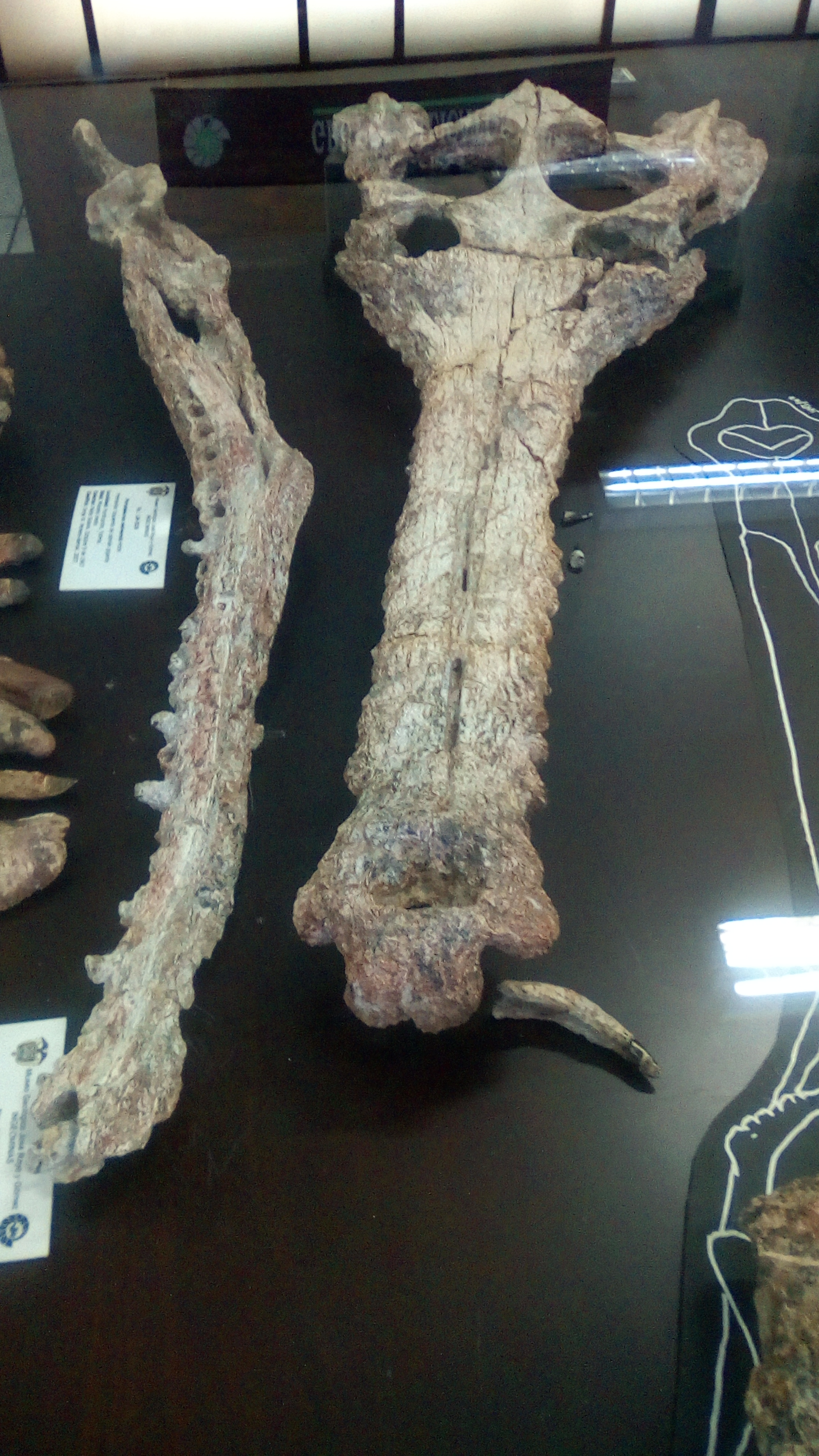
Fossils of the skull and mandible of G. colombianus, Museo Geológico José Royo y Gómez, Bogotá

The type species of Gryposuchus is G. jessei, named based on a well-preserved rostrum collected along the Pauini River of Brazil in 1912. The specimen was probably destroyed during World War II by the 1943 bombing of Hamburg. Another specimen named UFAC 1272, consisting of a premaxilla and maxilla, was discovered in the nearby Sena Madureia locality of the late Miocene Solimões Formation, in and referred to the species in 1997. Gryposuchus jessei may be also referred to from the Urumaco Formation of northwestern Venezuela. A second species, G. neogaeus, was referred to the genus in 1982; specimens from this species were first described from the late Miocene Ituzaingó Formation of Argentina in 1885, although it was referred to Rhamphostomopsis at the time.

Another species, G. colombianus, has been recovered from deposits from the Middle Miocene Honda Group of Colombia, and the late Miocene Urumaco Formation in Venezuela. This species, named in 1965, was originally referred to Gavialis. Fragmentary material of Gryposuchus from the Fitzcarrald Arch in the Peruvian Amazon dating back to the late middle Miocene bear a close resemblance to G. colombianus, but differ in rostrum proportions. G. neogaeus and G. colombianus have been proposed as synonyms of G. jessei, but this is unlikely due to the number of anatomical differences between them.

Size comparison of the different Gryposuchus species.

A species described in 2008, G. croizati, also found from the upper Miocene Urumaco Formation in Venezuela, can be distinguished from other species of Gryposuchus on the basis of a reduced number of maxillary teeth, a slender parietal interfenestral bar, and widely separated and reduced palatine fenestrae, and other characters. It is the largest Gryposuchus species and one of the largest crocodilians to have existed, based on measurements of the orbital cranial skeleton, the length of the animal has been estimated at around 10.15 metres (33.3 ft) in length, rivaling estimates of other giant gavialoids like Rhamphosuchus. G.colombianus has been estimated at 8 metres (26 ft) in length.

Gryposuchus fossil localities
Colloncuran
Laventan
Chasicoan
Huayquerian

Some skull material also recovered from Peruvian Amazon (Iquitos) in the Pebas Formation of the Middle Miocene, was named as Gryposuchus pachakamue in 2016 by Rodolfo Salas-Gismondi et al. It includes the holotype MUSM 987, a well preserved skull that lacks of temporal and occipital bones; it measures 623.2 millimeters in length, and a series of referred specimens, including juveniles. The species was named after the Quechuan word for a primordial god and "storyteller". This new species is characterized by orbits that did not protude upwards ("telescoped") as some gryposuchines and gavialines (like the modern gharial), which implies that both groups might have evolved this characteristic independently in fluvial enviroments.

Size of G. croizati (cyan) compared with other crocodyliforms

Indeterminate finds of Gryposuchus were noted from the early Miocene Castillo Formation of Venezuela, middle Miocene Pebas Formation of Peru, middle/late Miocene Tranquitas Formation of Argentina and from the late Miocene formations Urumaco of Venezuela and Solimões in both Brazil and Peru. Additionally, indeterminate finds of gavialoids (all in either coastal or marine sediments) are present in the early Miocene Jimol Formation and the early/middle Miocene Castilletes Formation in Colombia, and from the Oligo-Miocene boundary Pirabas Formation of coastal Brazil.

=== Phylogeny ===
A phylogenetic analysis conducted in a 2007 study found Gryposuchinae to include the genera Aktiogavialis, Gryposuchus, Ikanogavialis, Piscogavialis, and Siquisiquesuchus. Below is a cladogram from the 2007 analysis showing the phylogenetic relationships of gryposuchines among gavialoids:

- Gavialoidea
  - Eothoracosaurus
  - - Thoracosaurus
    - - Eosuchus
      - Argochampsa
      - Gavialidae
        - Eogavialis
        - - Gavialis
          - Gryposuchinae
            - Ikanogavialis
            - Piscogavialis
            - Siquisiquesuchus
            - Gryposuchus
            - Aktiogavialis

Alternatively, a 2018 tip dating study by Lee & Yates simultaneously using morphological, molecular (DNA sequencing), and stratigraphic (fossil age) data indicated that the members of Gryposuchinae and the genus Gryposuchus may in fact be paraphyletic and rather an evolutionary grade towards Gavialis and the gharial, as shown in the cladogram below:

- Gavialidae
  - - - - - - - - Gavialis gangeticus Gharial
                - Gavialis bengawanicus†
              - Gavialis browni†
            - Gryposuchus colombianus†
          - Ikanogavialis†
        - - Gryposuchus pachakamue†
          - Piscogavialis†
      - Harpacochampsa†
    - - - Toyotamaphimeia†
        - Penghusuchus†
      - Gavialosuchus†
  - - Tomistoma lusitanicum†
    - Tomistoma schlegelii False gharial

== Paleoecology ==
The Miocene epoch represents the only history of gavialoids (solely of the subfamily Gryposuchinae) in South America, from a Caribbean launchpad (Aktiogavialis from the Middle Oligocene of Puerto Rico, and Dadagavialis from the Early Miocene of Panama). Although there were six other confirmed genera of gryposuchine, Gryposuchus was almost certainly the most successful, with an existence potentially encompassing almost all of the Miocene, and a range from Venezuela to Argentina in the Middle to Late Miocene. This dominance was likely due to the fact that Gryposuchus was one of only two freshwater adapted gryposuchines (other than Hesperogavialis), whereas the others (such as Siquisiquesuchus and Piscogavialis) were either primarily estuarine, coastal or marine based predators. This would certainly have been useful in taking advantage of the extensive continental waterways and swamps of what would become the Amazon basin. Gryposuchus can be observed far and wide, from coastally adjacent and inclusive formations, such as the Urumaco Formation of Venezuela, to even beyond the northern drainage basins, into Argentina. This is in contrast with almost all the other species within the subfamily, which are limited to certain time periods near or on coast, with only Hesperogavialis penetrating into Brazil in the Late Miocene.

Although Gryposuchus had already reached Argentina by the Middle Miocene, known species diversity reached its peak by the Late Miocene, with four of the five species present, three of which were also overlapping in the Urumaco Formation. Gryposuchinae diversity also reached its peak, at five genera across South America. However, at the Miocene/Pliocene boundary, all Gavialoidea and Crocodyloidea (another superfamily colonising in the Miocene) were likely extirpated from South America, with the endemic Caimaninae undergoing a severe reduction in size and diversity as well. This was likely due to the continuing elevation of the northern sections of the Andes chain creating the future Amazon basin, re-rerouting drainage flowing towards the Caribbean to the much cooler Atlantic, and transforming the mega-wetlands responsible for the hyper-diversity of crocodilians into a fully developed riverine drainage system. The co-current aridification of the continental interior, and filling of peripheral wetland basins, further restricted the space and food resources of these large, food-intensive specialist crocodilians, and was probably the primary cause of their extinction.
