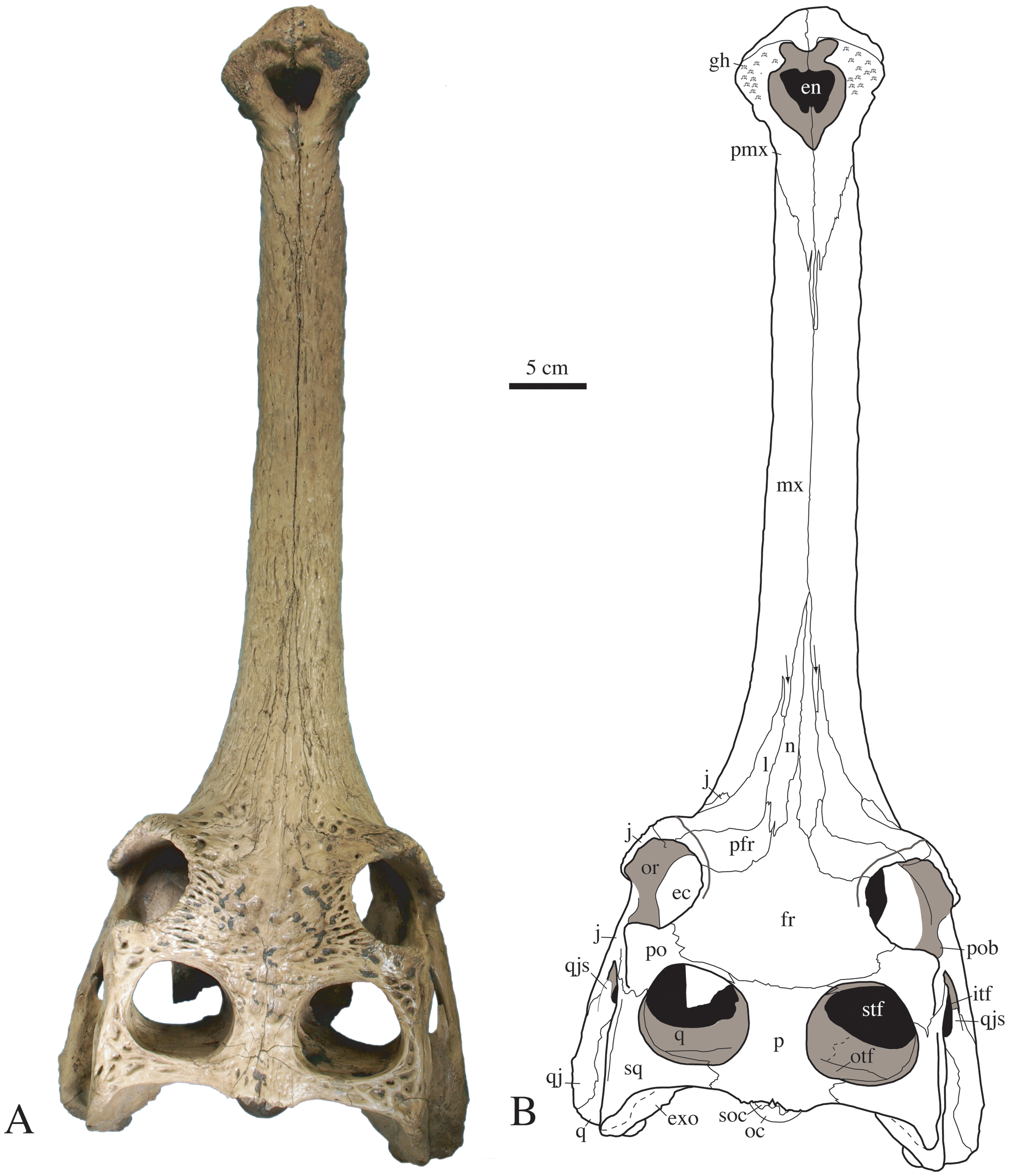

Scientific classification
- Kingdom: Animalia
- Phylum: Chordata
- Class: Reptilia
- Clade: Archosauria
- Order: Crocodilia
- Family: Gavialidae
- Genus: Gavialis
- Species: †G. bengawanicus

Binomial name
- †Gavialis bengawanicus Dubois, 1908

= Gavialis bengawanicus =

Gavialis bengawanicus Temporal range: Early Pleistocene–Middle Pleistocene

Extinct species of reptile

Gavialis bengawanicus is an extinct species of crocodilian that is related to the modern Indian gharial. Fossils have been found in Thailand and Indonesia. The type locality is at Trinil.

The presence of this species in Thailand may provide an explanation for the distribution of fossil gharials that appears disjunct, covering Pakistan and Java but not the connecting areas. The fossils suggest that gharials may have dispersed from Indo-Pakistan to Indonesia through Thailand without having to resort to marine routes.

Below is a cladogram that shows the proposed phylogeny within Gavialidae, including extinct members, and how Gavialis bengawanicus is most closely related to the living gharial:

- Gavialidae
  - - - - - - - - Gavialis gangeticus Gharial
                - Gavialis bengawanicus†
              - Gavialis browni†
            - Gryposuchus colombianus†
          - Ikanogavialis†
        - - Gryposuchus pachakamue†
          - Piscogavialis†
      - Harpacochampsa†
    - - - Toyotamaphimeia†
        - Penghusuchus†
      - Gavialosuchus†
  - - Tomistoma lusitanicum†
    - Tomistoma schlegelii False gharial
