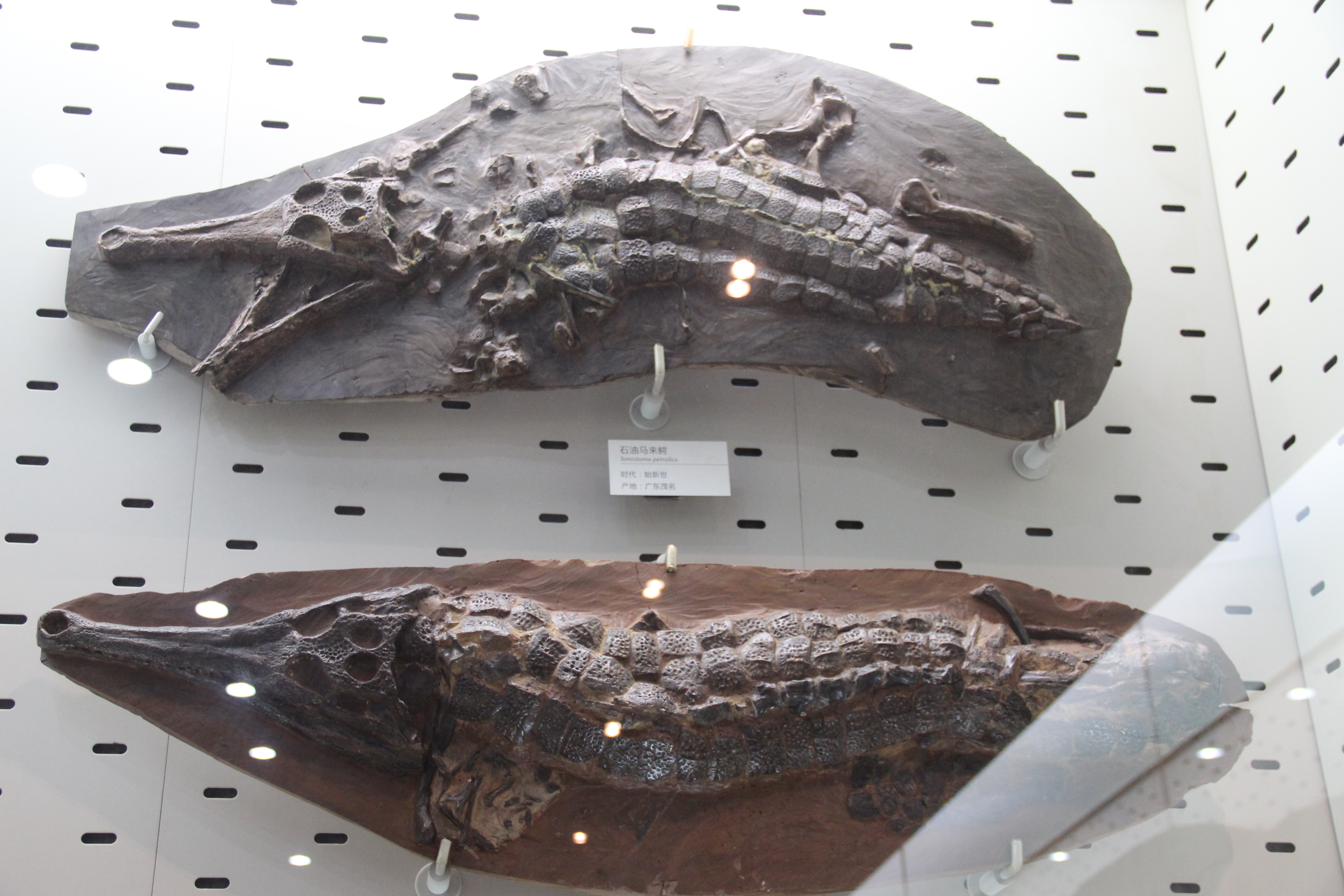
- Two fossils, Zhejiang Natural History Museum

Scientific classification
- Kingdom: Animalia
- Phylum: Chordata
- Class: Reptilia
- Clade: Archosauria
- Order: Crocodilia
- Clade: Longirostres
- Superfamily: Gavialoidea
- Genus: †Maomingosuchus; Shan et al., 2017

Species
- Maomingosuchus petrolica (Yeh, 1958) (Type); Maomingosuchus acutirostris Massonne et al., 2022

Synonyms
- Tomistoma petrolica Yeh, 1958

= Maomingosuchus =

Maomingosuchus Temporal range: Late Eocene: Priabonian, 37.8–33.9 Ma

Extinct genus of reptiles

Maomingosuchus is an extinct genus of gavialoid crocodylian from Late Eocene of Southeast Asia. It was discovered in Priabonian-aged deposits of China and possibly also Thailand. The type species, originally Tomistoma petrolica, was named in 1958 and was redescribed as Maomingosuchus in 2017. A second species, Maomingosuchus acutirostris, was described in 2022 from middle-upper Eocence deposits (late Bartonian–Priabonian age, 39–35 Ma) of the Na Duong Basin in northern Vietnam. It is proposed to be a basal member of Gavialoidea, or alternatively within the family Tomistominae. It was a relatively small gavialoid with an estimated total length of 3–3.5 metres (9.8–11.5 ft).

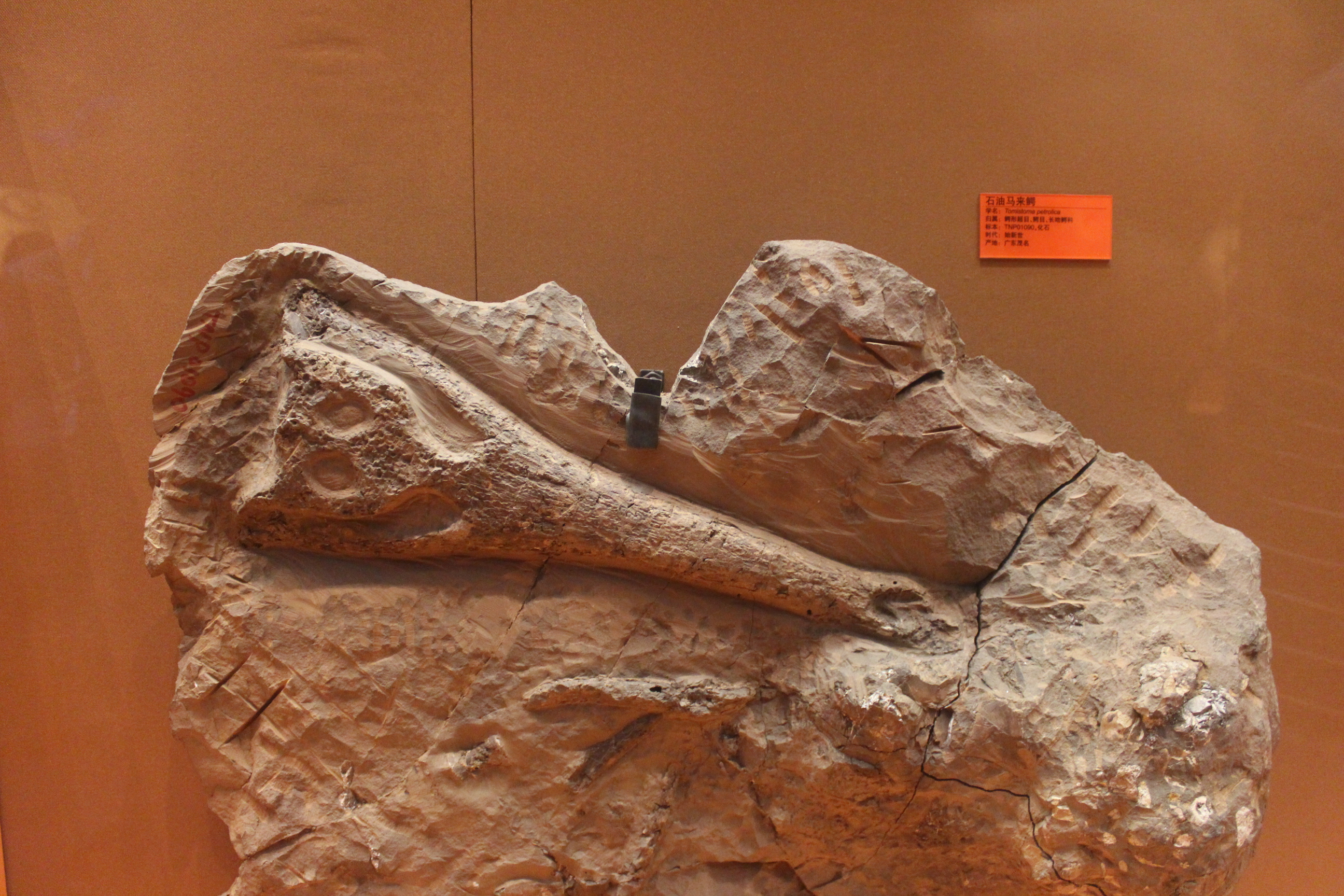
Skull, Tianjin Natural History Museum
