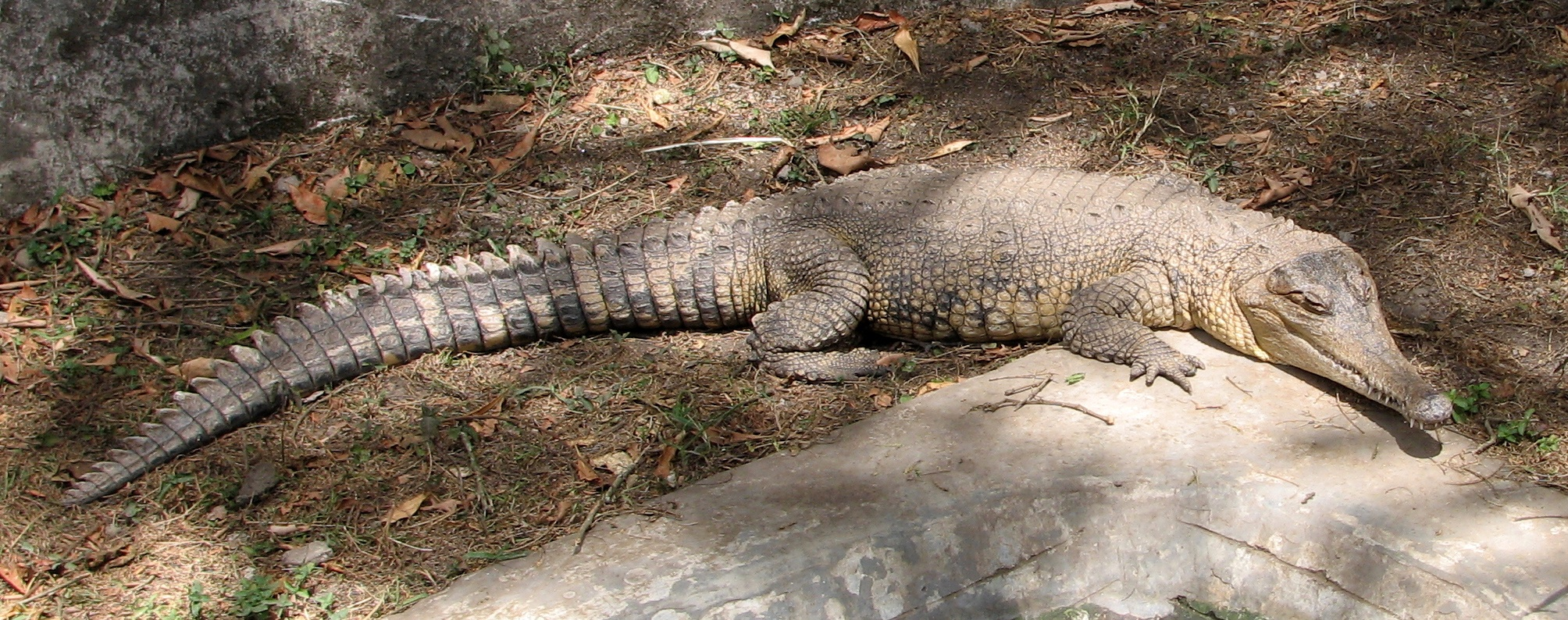
- Individual on a snake farm in Tanzania

Conservation status
- CITES Appendix II

Scientific classification
- Kingdom: Animalia
- Phylum: Chordata
- Class: Reptilia
- Clade: Archosauria
- Order: Crocodilia
- Superfamily: Crocodyloidea
- Family: Crocodylidae
- Genus: Mecistops
- Species: M. leptorhynchus

Binomial name
- Mecistops leptorhynchus (Bennett, 1835)

Synonyms
- Crocodilus leptorhynchus Bennett, 1835; Mecistops leptorhynchus Shirley et al., 2018

= Central African slender-snouted crocodile =

Species of reptile

The Central African slender-snouted crocodile (Mecistops leptorhynchus) is one of two species of crocodiles in the genus Mecistops. It was once thought to be a population of the West African slender-snouted crocodile (Mecistops cataphractus) but was elevated to a species after two detailed studies, one in 2014 and the other in 2018.

The species was described in 1835 on the basis of a specimen that had died at the London Zoo and had been claimed to have been collected in the Fernando Po. Studies of specimens and their molecular sequences established that there were two different species which occurred in distinct hydrological zones. M. leptorhynchus is easily differentiated morphologically from M. cataphractus by the absence of a round tubercle or boss on the squamosal scale at the back of the head in the former and present in the latter.

== Etymology ==
The genus name Mecistops is most probably derived from the Ancient Greek words μήκιστ (mēkist), meaning "longest", and ὄψ (óps) meaning "face". The specific epithet leptorhynchus is derived from the Ancient Greek words λεπτός (leptós), meaning "thin", and ῥύγχος (rhúnkhos), meaning "snout". Bennett (1835) may have named the species so because he found it had a longer head width:head length ratio than M. cataphractus, 3:1 versus 2.5:1. Although an analysis of 93 skulls, mainly belonging to mature individuals, by Shirley et al. (2018) found a head width:head length ratio of 2.25:1 for M. cataphractus and 2.37:1 for M. leptorhynchus.

== Taxonomy ==
Gray (1844) listed Mecistops leptorhynchus as a synonym of M. bennettii even though the former has temporal priority. M. bennettii was subsumed as a junior synonym of M. leptorhynchus in Gray's Synopsis of the Species of Recent Crocodilians as he found that the type specimen of M. bennettii (NHMUK 1977.444) is actually an adult M. leptorhynchus. The International Code of Zoological Nomenclature (ICZN) does not allow the specific epithet (species name) to be changed upon removal to a new genus unless it already exists in the new genus. Since Mecistops was a new genus at the time of its description, M. bennettii is a nomen novum (replacement name). Shirley et al. (2018) found that the type specimen of M. bennettii is morphologically and geographically readily assignable to M. cataphractus so they synonymized M. bennettii with M. cataphractus.

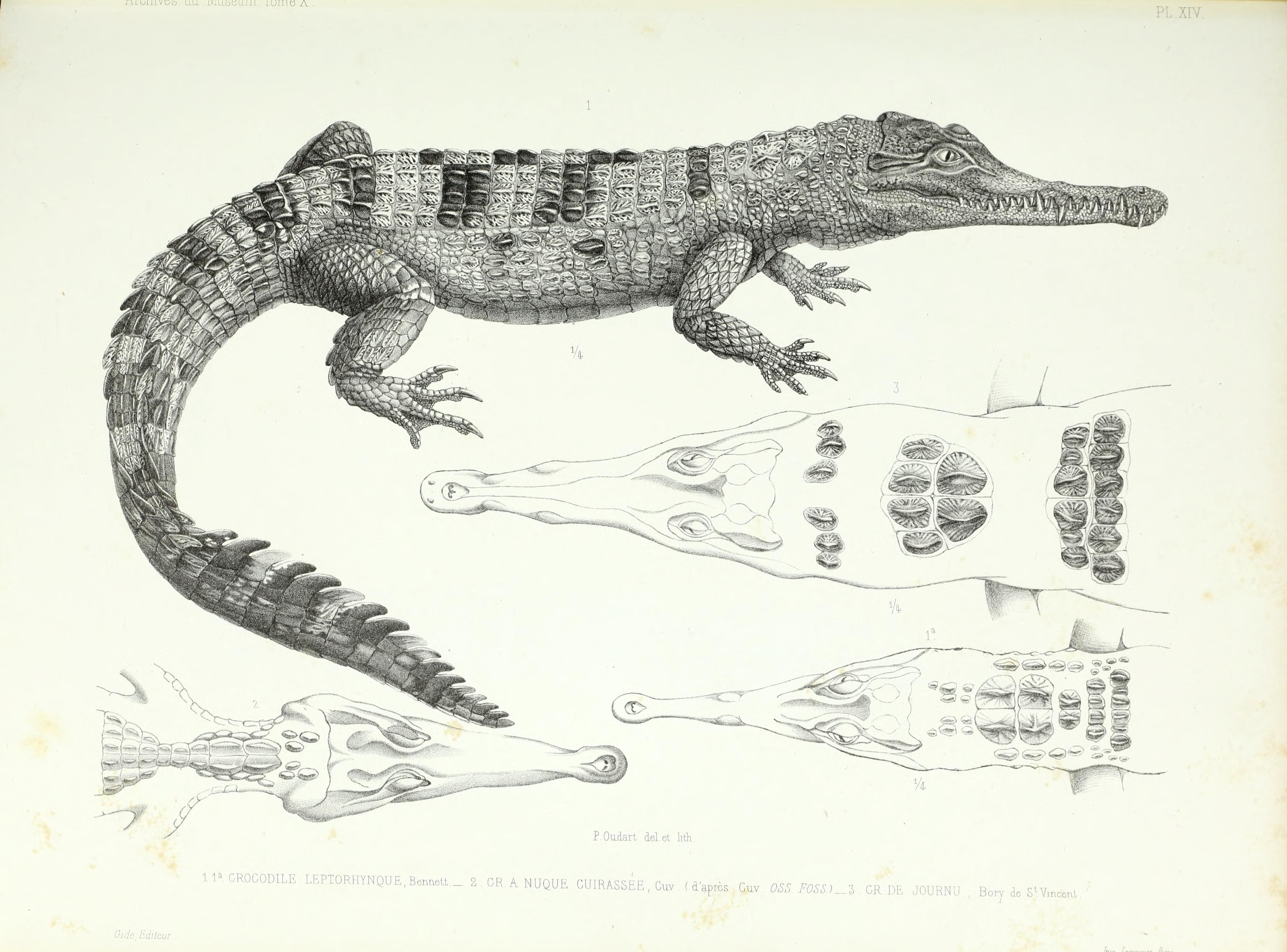
Illustration from the National Museum of Natural History (NMNH), Paris

Shirley et al. (2018) also designated M. cataphractus as the type species of Mecistops in accordance with Articles 69 and 70 of the ICZN. Article 67.9 of the ICZN states "If a validly fixed type species is later found to have been misidentified, the provisions of Article 70.3 apply." Article 70.3 in turn states "If an author discovers that a type species was misidentified, the author may select, and thereby fix as type species, the species that will, in his or her judgment, best serve stability and universality, either." M. cataphractus best serves stability because it is the most well-studied species of Mecistops with the most readily recognizable and assignable type material. It also has the widest use in the scientific literature.

== Distribution ==
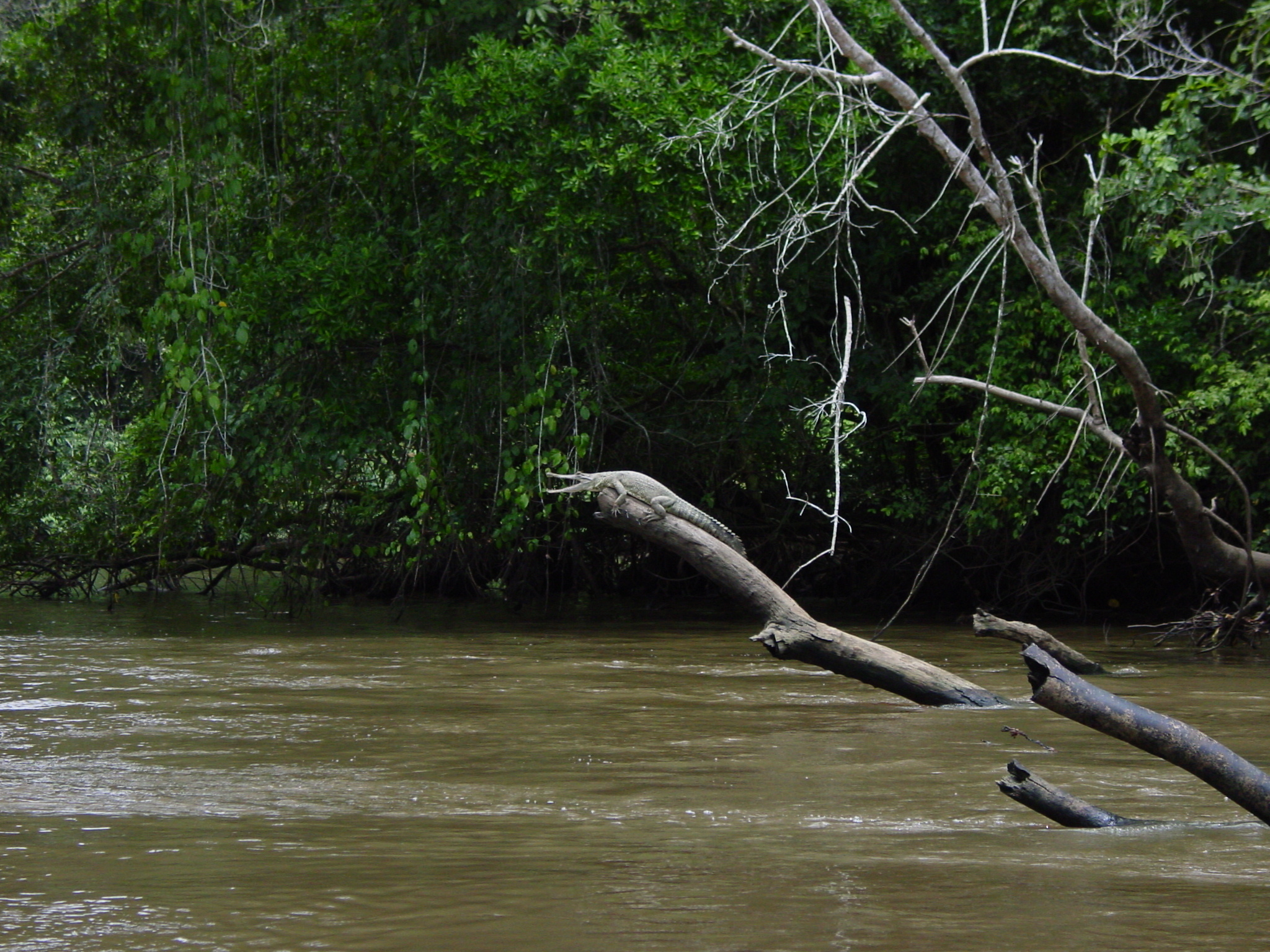
Individual resting on a partially-submerged tree at Odzala-Kokoua National Park in the Republic of Congo

Central African slender-snouted crocodile occurs widely in Central Africa (Cameroon, Equatorial Guinea, Gabon, northern Angola, Central African Republic, Republic of the Congo, Democratic Republic of the Congo) and extends into South Sudan in East Africa.
