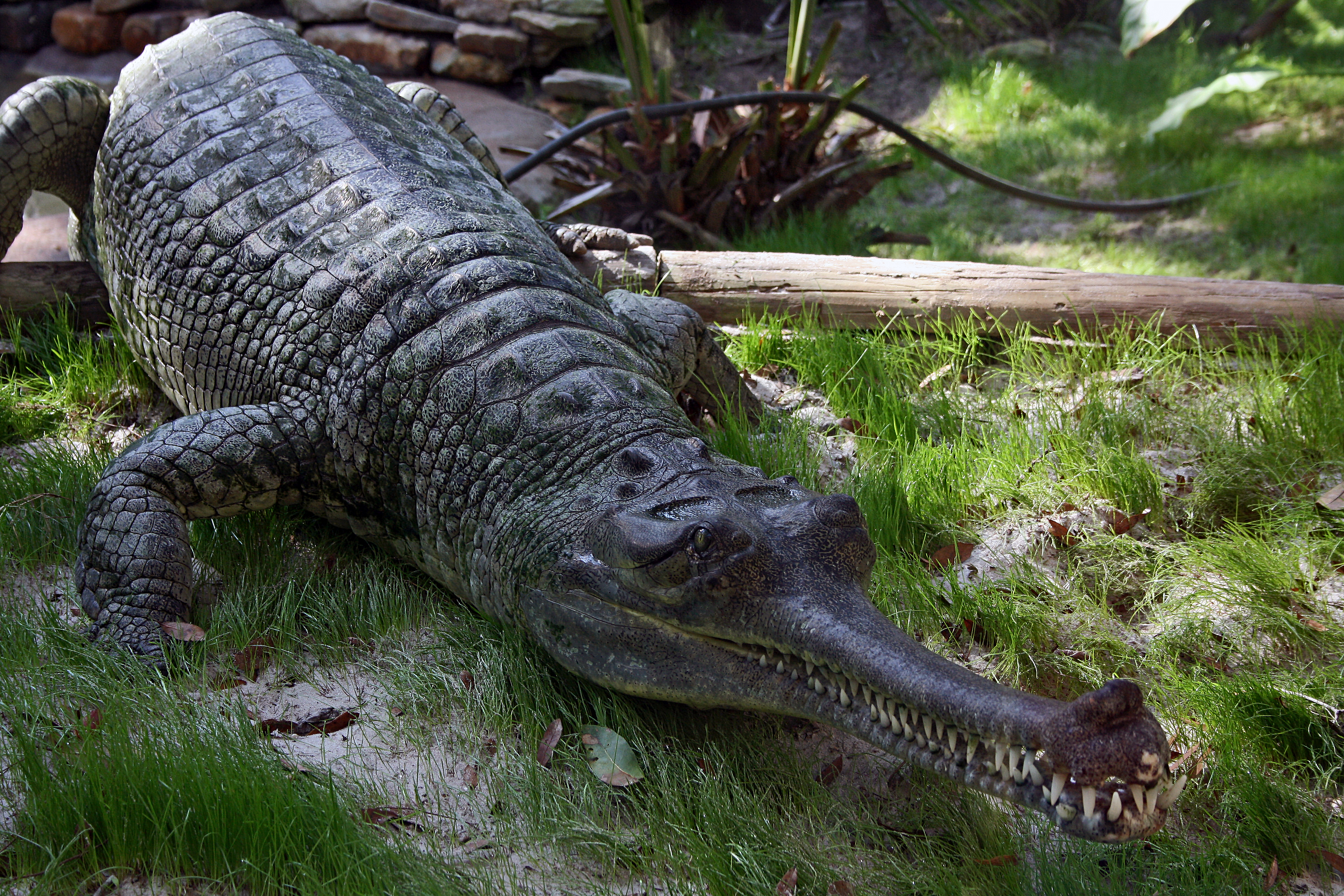
- Indian gharial, Gavialis gangeticus

Scientific classification
- Kingdom: Animalia
- Phylum: Chordata
- Class: Reptilia
- Order: Crocodylia
- Superfamily: Gavialoidea
- Family: Gavialidae; Adams, 1854

Subfamilies
- Gavialinae; Tomistominae; †Gryposuchinae?

= Gavialidae =

Gavialidae Temporal range: Eocene, 38–0 Ma

Family of gharial crocodylians

Gavialidae is a family of large semiaquatic crocodilians with elongated, narrow snouts. Gavialidae consists of two living species, the gharial (Gavialis gangeticus) and the false gharial (Tomistoma schlegelii), both occurring in Asia. Many extinct members are known from a broader range, including the recently extinct Hanyusuchus. Gavialids are generally regarded as lacking the jaw strength to capture the large mammalian prey favoured by crocodiles and alligators of similar size so their thin snout is best used to catch fish, however the false gharial has been found to have a generalist diet with mature adults preying upon larger vertebrates, such as ungulates.

== Taxonomy ==
The family Gavialidae was proposed by Arthur Adams in 1854 for reptiles with a very long and slender muzzle, webbed feet and nearly equal teeth. It is currently recognized as a crown group, meaning that it only includes the last common ancestor of all extant (living) gavialids (the gharial and false gharial) and their descendants (living or extinct).

Traditionally, crocodiles and alligators were considered more closely related and grouped together in the clade Brevirostres, to the exclusion of the gharials. This classification was based on morphological studies primarily focused on analyzing skeletal traits of living and extinct fossil species. However, recent molecular studies using DNA sequencing have rejected Brevirostres upon finding the crocodiles and gavialids to be more closely related than the alligators. The new clade Longirostres was named by Harshman et al. in 2003.

In addition, these recent molecular DNA studies consistently indicate that the false gharial (Tomistoma) (and by inference other related extinct forms) traditionally viewed as belonging to the crocodylian subfamily Tomistominae actually belong to Gavialoidea (and Gavialidae). As its name suggests, the false gharial was once thought to be only distantly related to the gharial despite its similar appearance. The false gharial and other tomistomines were traditionally classified within the superfamily Crocodyloidea as close relatives of crocodiles, based solely on morphological evidence.

A 2018 tip dating study by Lee & Yates simultaneously using morphological, molecular (DNA sequencing), and stratigraphic (fossil age) data established the inter-relationships within Crocodilia, which was expanded upon in 2021 by Hekkala et al. using paleogenomics by extracting DNA from the extinct Voay. The tip dating analysis resolved the extinct Thoracosaurus and similar extinct close relatives ("thoracosaurs") as outside of Gavialoidea due to the large time difference. They concluded that the only possible explanation for the morphological data placing thoracosaurs within the gharial lineage was a significant amount of homoplastic convergence between thoracosaurs and Gavialis.

The below cladogram from latest study shows Gavialidae's placement within Crocodylia:

- Crocodylia (crown group)
  - Alligatoroidea (stem-based group)
    - extinct basal Alligatoroids†
    - Alligatoridae (crown group)
      - Caimaninae
        - - Caiman
          - Melanosuchus
        - Paleosuchus
      - Alligatorinae
        Alligator
  - Longirostres (crown group)
    - Crocodyloidea (stem-based group)
      - "Crocodylus" megarhinus†
      - Crocodylidae (crown group)
        - Crocodylus
        - - Mecistops
          - Osteolaemus
    - Gavialoidea (stem-based group)
      - Kentisuchus†
      - - - Maroccosuchus†
          - Paratomistoma†
        - - Dollosuchoides†
          - - Herugavialis†
            - Gavialidae (crown group)
              - Gavialis
              - Tomistoma

Here is a more detailed cladogram that shows the proposed phylogeny of Gavialidae including extinct members:

- - Crocodyloidea
  - Gavialoidea
    - - †Maroccosuchus zennaroi
      - †Megadontosuchus arduini
      - †Dollosuchoides densmorei
      - †Xaymacachampsa kugleri
      - - †Kentisuchus astrei
        - †Kentisuchus spenceri
    - Gavialidae
      - †Tomistoma cairense
      - †Tomistoma coppensi
      - †Maomingosuchus petrolica
      - Tomistominae
        - Tomistoma schlegelii, false gharial
        - - †Tomistoma lusitanicum
          - - †Gavialosuchus eggenburgensis
            - - †Melitosaurus champsoides
              - †Tomistoma calaritanum
              - †Tomistoma gaudense
              - - †Thecachampsa carolinensis
                - †Thecachampsa antiqua
      - Gavialinae
        - †Paratomistoma courti
        - - - †Penghusuchus pani
            - - †Toyotamaphimeia machikanensis
              - †Hanyusuchus sinensis
          - - - †Eosuchus lerichei
              - †Eosuchus minor
            - - †Ocepesuchus eoafricanus
              - - †Eothoracosaurus mississippiensis
                - - †Thoracosaurus macrorhynchus
                  - †Thoracosaurus neocesariensis
              - - †Aktiogavialis puertoricensis
                - †Eogavialis africanum
                - - †Argochampsa krebsi
                  - - †Piscogavialis jugaliperforatus
                    - - †Ikanogavialis gameroi
                      - - †Siquisiquesuchus venezuelensis
                        - - †Dadagavialis gunai
                          - - †Gryposuchus neogaeus
                            - †Gryposuchus croizati
                            - - †Aktiogavialis caribesi
                              - †Gryposuchus pachakamue
                          - - †Gryposuchus colombianus
                            - †Rhamphosuchus crassidens
                            - †Myanmar gavialid
                            - †Gavialis lewisi
                            - †Gavialis bengawanicus
                            - - Gavialis gangeticus, gharial
                              - †Siwalik Gavialis

=== Species list ===
Family Gavialidae

- Subfamily Tomistominae
  - Genus †Gavialosuchus?
  - Genus †Maomingosuchus?
  - Genus †Melitosaurus
  - Genus †Paratomistoma?
  - Genus †Thecachampsa?
  - Genus Tomistoma
    - Tomistoma schlegelii, false gharial or Malayan gharial
    - †Tomistoma lusitanicum
- Subfamily Gavialinae
  - Genus †Aktiogavialis
  - Genus †Argochampsa?
  - Genus †Dadagavialis
  - Genus †Eogavialis?
  - Genus †Eosuchus?
  - Genus †Eothoracosaurus?
  - Genus Gavialis
    - Gavialis gangeticus, gharial
    - †Gavialis bengawanicus
  - Genus †Gavialosuchus?
  - Genus †Gryposuchus? (may by paraphyletic, along with Gryposuchinae)
  - Genus †Hanyusuchus
  - Genus †Harpacochampsa?
  - Genus †Hesperogavialis
  - Genus †Ikanogavialis
  - Genus †Maomingosuchus?
  - Genus †Ocepesuchus
  - Genus †Paratomistoma?
  - Genus †Penghusuchus
  - Genus †Piscogavialis
  - Genus †Rhamphosuchus
  - Genus †Siquisiquesuchus
  - Genus †Thoracosaurus?
  - Genus †Toyotamaphimeia

† Indicates extinct group

=== Extant species ===
Image	Scientific name	Common name	Distribution
	Gavialis gangeticus	Gharial	India
	Tomistoma schlegelii	False gharial, Malayan gharial, Sunda gharial and tomistoma	Peninsular Malaysia, Borneo, Sumatra, and Java.
