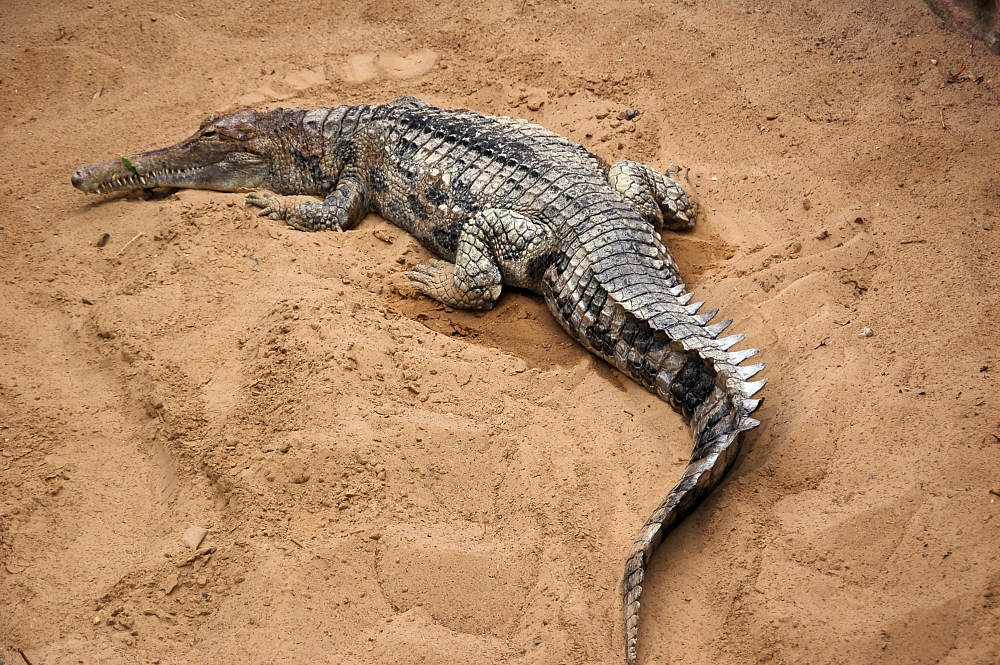
- Captive in Berlin Zoo, Germany

Conservation status
- Endangered (IUCN 3.1)
- CITES Appendix I

Scientific classification
- Kingdom: Animalia
- Phylum: Chordata
- Class: Reptilia
- Order: Crocodylia
- Family: Gavialidae
- Subfamily: Tomistominae
- Genus: Tomistoma; Müller, 1846
- Species: T. schlegelii

Binomial name
- Tomistoma schlegelii (Müller, 1838)
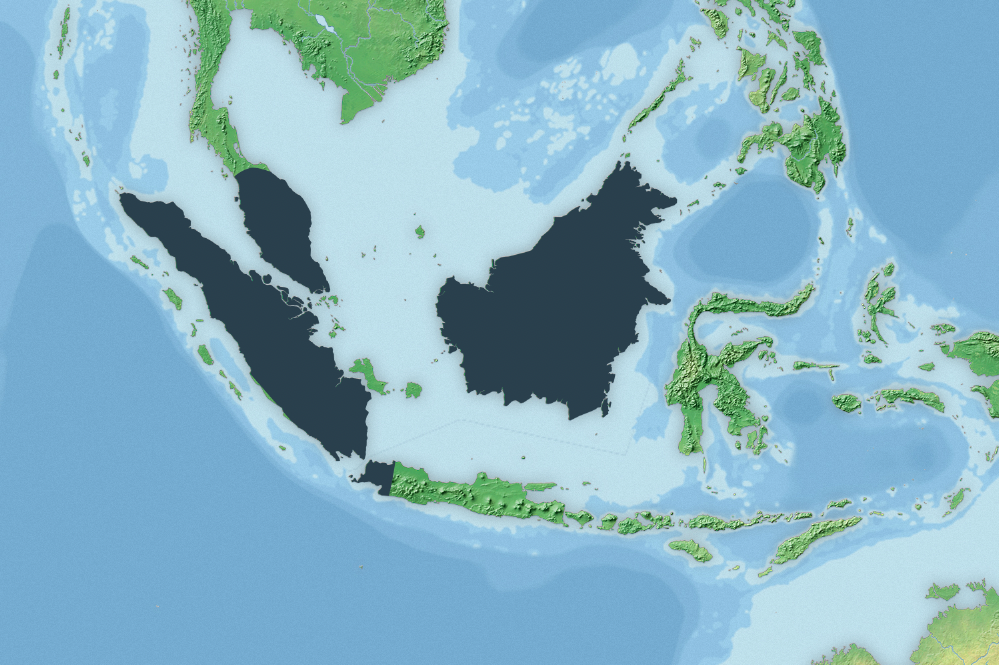
- Range of the false gharial

Synonyms
- Crocodilus schlegelii Müller, 1838; Tomistoma schelegelii Müller, 1846

= False gharial =

False gharial Temporal range: Late Pleistocene - Recent, 0.1–0 Ma

Species of crocodilian

The false gharial (Tomistoma schlegelii), also known by the names Malayan gharial, Sunda gharial and tomistoma, is a freshwater crocodilian of the family Gavialidae native to Peninsular Malaysia, Borneo, Sumatra and Java. It is listed as Endangered on the IUCN Red List, as the global population is estimated at around 2,500 to 10,000 mature individuals.

The species name schlegelii honors Hermann Schlegel.

== Characteristics ==
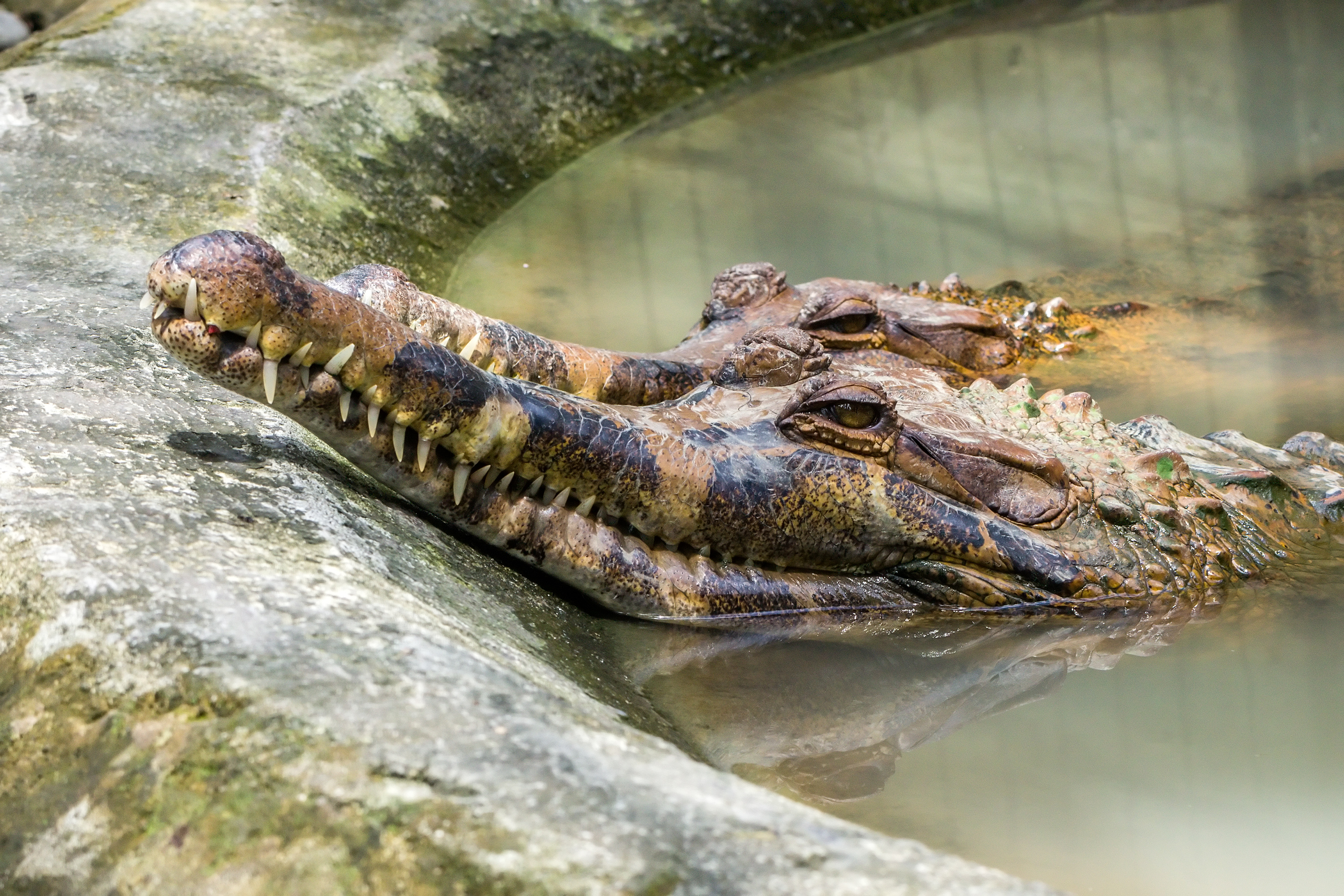
Gembira Loka Zoo

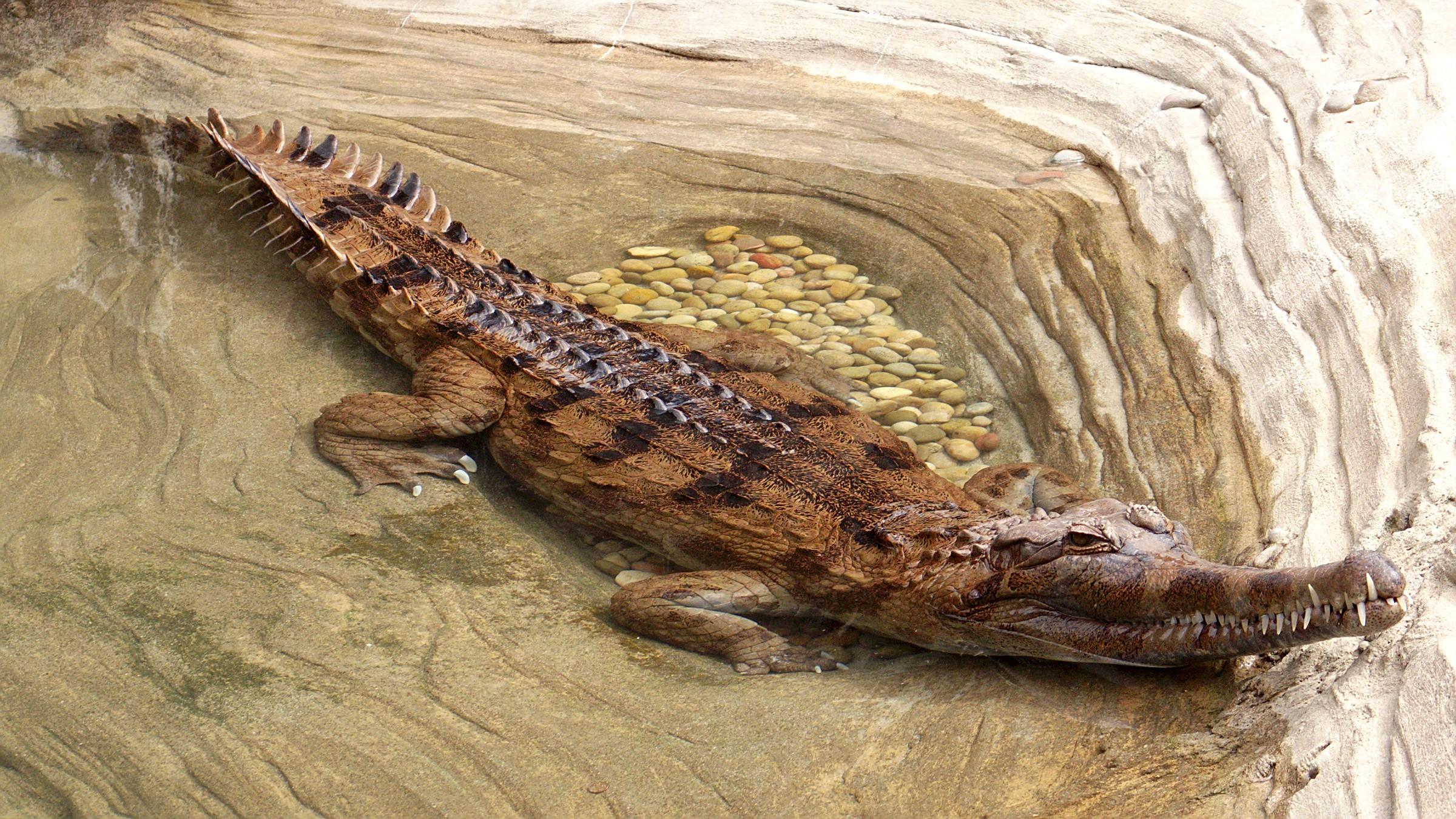
Los Angeles Zoo

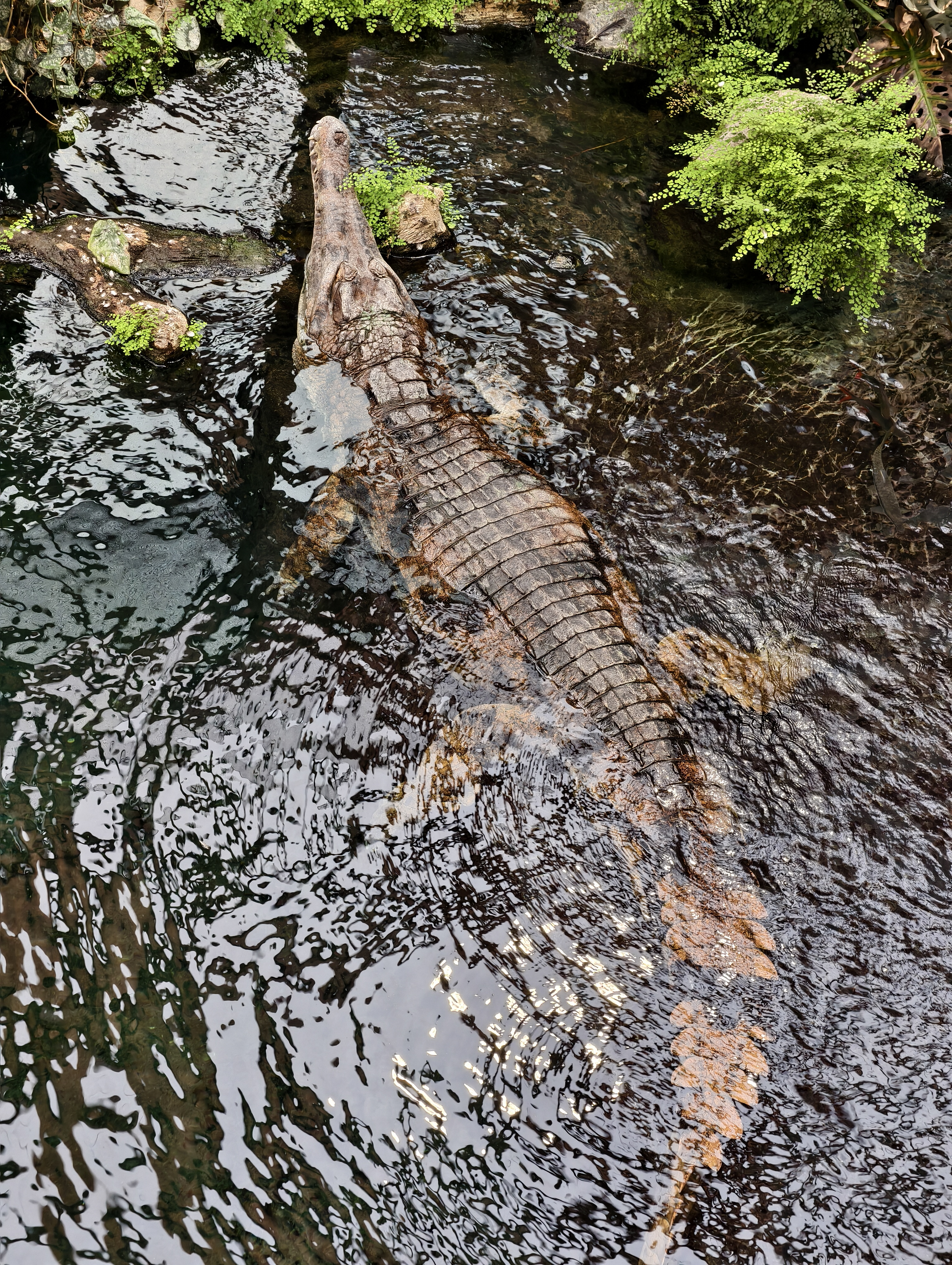
In Orientarium ZOO, Łódź, Poland

Skull at the Zoological Museum of the Zoological Institute of the Russian Academy of Sciences, St. Petersburg

The false gharial is dark reddish-brown above with dark brown or black spots and cross-bands on the back and tail. Ventrals are grayish-white, with some lateral dark mottling. Juveniles are mottled with black on the sides of the jaws, body, and tail. The smooth and unornamented snout is extremely long and slender, parallel sided, with a length of 3.0 to 3.5 times the width at the base. All teeth are long and needle-like, interlocking on the insides of the jaws, and are individually socketed. The dorsal scales are broad at midbody and extend onto the sides of the body. The digits are webbed at the base. Integumentary sensory organs are present on the head and body scalation. Scales behind the head are frequently a slightly enlarged single pair. Some individuals bear a number of adjoining small keeled scales. Scalation is divided medially by soft granular skin. Three transverse rows of two enlarged nuchal scales are continuous with the dorsal scales, which consist of 22 transverse rows of six to eight scales, are broad at midbody and extend onto the sides of the body. Nuchal and dorsal rows equals a total of 22 to 23 rows. It has 18 double-crested caudal whorls and 17 single-crested caudal whorls. The flanks have one or two longitudinal rows of six to eight very enlarged scales on each side.

The false gharial has one of the slimmest snouts of any living crocodilian, comparable to that of the slender-snouted crocodile and the freshwater crocodile in slenderness; only that of the gharial is noticeably slimmer. Three mature males kept in captivity measured 3.6 to 3.9 m (12 to 13 ft) and weighed 190 to 210 kg (420 to 460 lb), while a female measured 3.27 m (10.7 ft) and weighed 93 kg (205 lb). Females are up to 4 m (13 ft) long. Males can grow up to 5 m (16 ft) in length and weigh up to 600 kg (1,300 lb). The false gharial apparently has the largest skull of any extant crocodilian, in part because of the great length of the slender snout. Out of the eight longest crocodilian skulls from existing species that could be found in museums around the world, six of these belonged to false gharials. The longest crocodilian skull belonging to an extant species was of this species and measured 84 cm (33 in) in length, with a mandibular length of 104 cm (41 in). Most of the owners of these enormous skulls had no confirmed (or even anecdotal) total measurements for the animals, but based on the known skull-to-total length ratio for the species they would measure approximately 5.5 to 6.1 m (18 to 20 ft) in length.

Three individuals ranging from 2.9 to 4.05 m (9 ft 6 in to 13 ft 3 in) in length and weighing from 79 to 255 kg (174 to 562 lb) had a bite force of 1,704–6,450 N (383–1,450 lb_{f}).

== Taxonomy ==
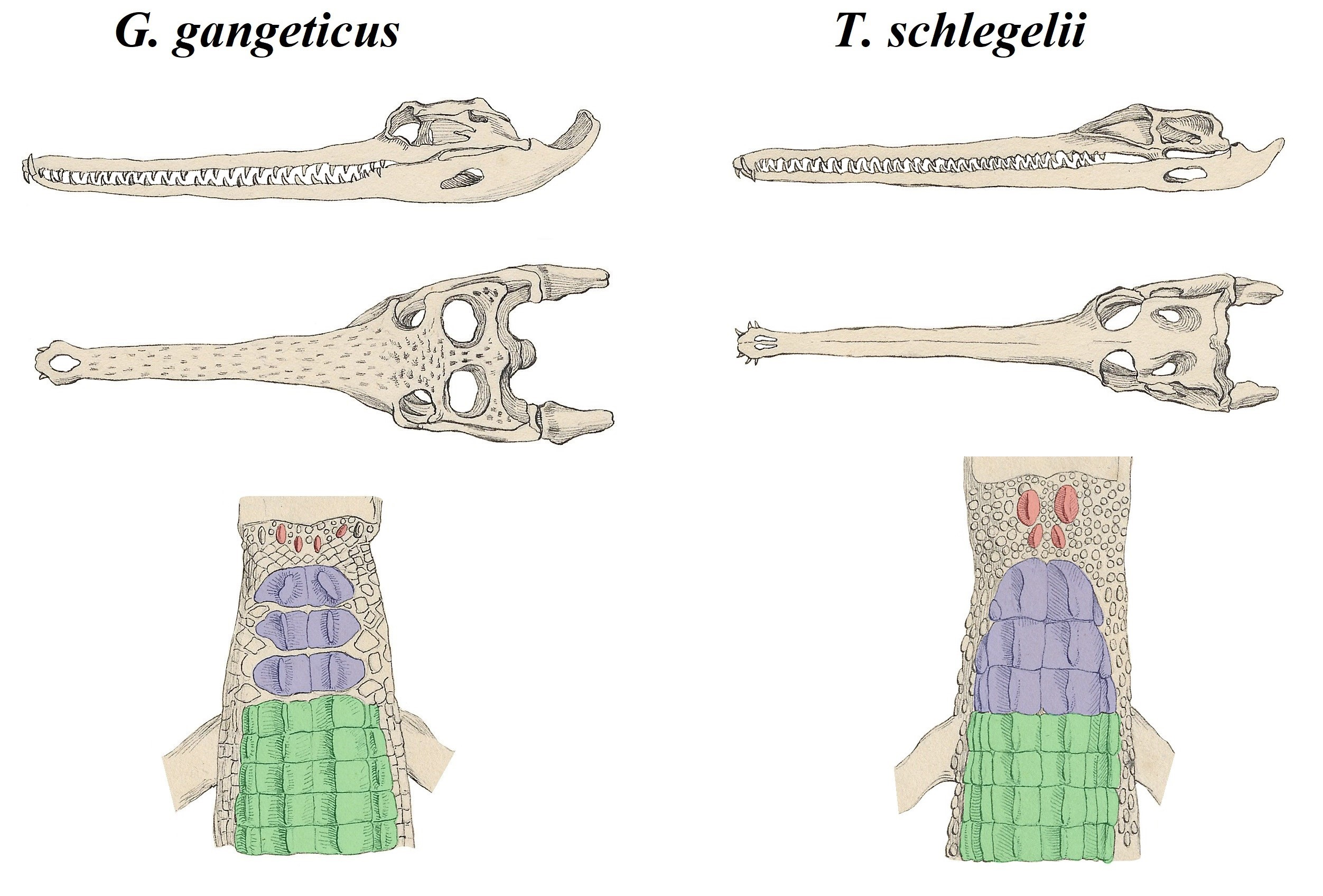
Compared to the Indian gharial.

The scientific name Crocodilus (Gavialis) schlegelii was proposed by Salomon Müller in 1838 who described a specimen collected in Borneo. In 1846, he proposed to use the name Tomistoma schlegelii, if it needs to be placed in a distinct genus.

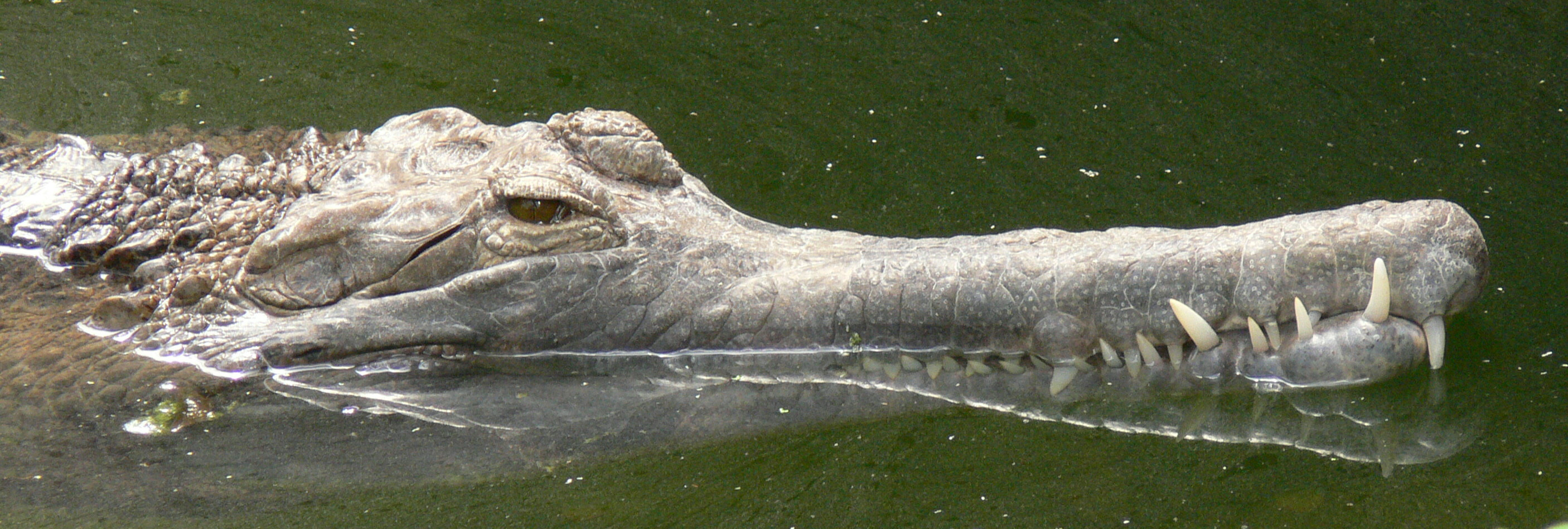
Close-up of at the Tierpark Berlin

The genus Tomistoma potentially also contains several extinct species like T. cairense, T. lusitanicum, T. taiwanicus, and T. coppensi. However, these species may need to be reclassified to different genera as evidence suggests they may be paraphyletic. The false gharial's snout broadens considerably towards the base and so is more similar to those of true crocodiles than to the gharial (Gavialis gangeticus), whose osteology indicated a distinct lineage from all other living crocodilians. However, although more morphologically similar to Crocodylidae based on skeletal features, recent molecular studies using DNA sequencing consistently indicate that the false gharial and by inference other related extinct forms traditionally viewed as belonging to the crocodylian subfamily Tomistominae actually belong to Gavialoidea and Gavialidae.

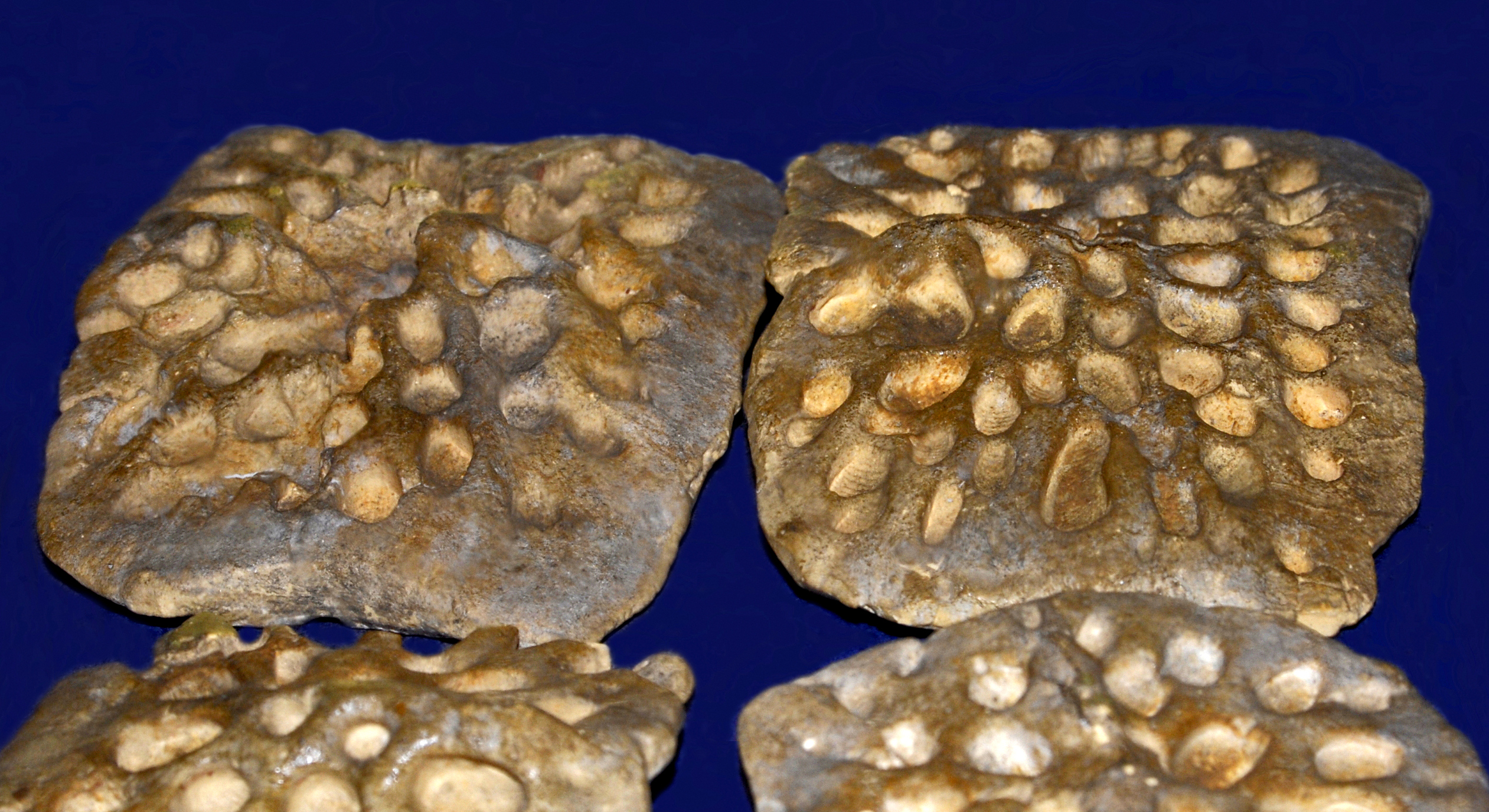
Fossil dorsal plates of "Tomistoma" calaritanus

Fossils of extinct Tomistoma species have been found in deposits of Paleogene, Neogene, and Quaternary ages in Taiwan, Uganda, Italy, Portugal, Egypt and India, but nearly all of them are likely to be distinct genera due to older age compared to the false gharial.

The below cladogram of the major living crocodile groups is based on molecular studies and shows the false gharial's close relationships:

- Crocodilia
  - Alligatoridae
    - Caimaninae
      - - Caiman
        - Melanosuchus
      - Paleosuchus
    - Alligatorinae
      Alligator
  - Longirostres
    - Crocodylidae
      - Crocodylus
      - - Mecistops
        - Osteolaemus
    - Gavialidae
      - Gavialis
      - Tomistoma

The following cladogram shows the false gharial's placement within the Gavialidae; it is based on a tip dating study, for which morphological, DNA sequencing and stratigraphic data were analysed:

- Gavialoidea (stem-based group)
  - - - - Gavialidae (crown group)
          - - - - - - - - Gharial
                        - Gavialis bengawanicus†
                      - Gavialis browni†
                    - Gryposuchus colombianus†
                  - Ikanogavialis†
                - - Gryposuchus pachakamue†
                  - Piscogavialis†
              - Harpacochampsa†
            - - - Toyotamaphimeia†
                - Penghusuchus†
              - Gavialosuchus†
          - - Tomistoma lusitanicum†
            - False gharial
        - Tomistoma cairense†
      - Dollosuchoides†
    - - Maroccosuchus†
      - Paratomistoma†
  - Kentisuchus†

== Distribution and habitat ==
The false gharial is native to Peninsular Malaysia and the islands of Borneo and Sumatra; it is locally extinct in Java and Thailand. It inhabits peat swamps and lowland swamp forests.

Prior to the 1950s, Tomistoma occurred in freshwater ecosystems along the entire length of Sumatra east of the Barisan Mountains. The current distribution in eastern Sumatra has been reduced by 30-40% due to hunting, logging, fires, and agriculture. The population has been estimated to comprise less than 2,500 mature individuals as of 2010.

== Ecology and behaviour ==
=== Diet ===
Until recently, very little was known about the diet or behaviour of the false gharial in the wild. Details are slowly being revealed. In the past, the false gharial was thought to have a diet of only fish and very small vertebrates, but more recent evidence indicates that it has a generalist diet despite its narrow snout. In addition to fish and smaller aquatic animals, mature adults prey on larger vertebrates, including proboscis monkeys, long-tailed macaques, deer, water birds, and reptiles. There is an eyewitness account of a false gharial attacking a cow in East Kalimantan.

The false gharial may be considered an ecological equivalent to Neotropical crocodiles such as the Orinoco and American crocodiles, which both have slender snouts but a broad diet.

=== Reproduction ===
The false gharial is a mound-nester. Females lay small clutches of 13–35 eggs per nest and appear to produce the largest eggs of living crocodilians. They attain sexual maturity at a length of around 2.5 to 3 m (8 ft 2 in to 9 ft 10 in), which is large compared to other crocodilians. Courtship coincides with periods of rainfall in November to February and from April to June.

=== Conflict ===
In 2008, a 4-m female false gharial attacked and ate a fisherman in central Kalimantan; his remains were found in the gharial's stomach. This was the first verified fatal human attack by a false gharial. At least two more verified fatal attacks on humans by false gharials had occurred by 2012, although the true frequency of attacks is unknown due to difficulties with species identification.

== Threats ==
The false gharial is threatened by habitat loss in most of its range due to the drainage of freshwater swamps and conversion for commercial plantation of oil palms. It is also hunted for its skin and meat, and its eggs are often harvested for human consumption. Population surveys carried out in the mid 2000s indicated that the distribution of individuals is spotty and disconnected, with a risk of genetic isolation. Some population units in unprotected areas do not bear viable breeding adults.

== Conservation ==
The false gharial is listed on CITES Appendix I.

Steps have been taken by the Malaysian and Indonesian governments to prevent its extinction in the wild. There are reports of some populations rebounding in Indonesia, yet with this slight recovery, mostly irrational fears of attacks have surfaced amongst the local human population.
