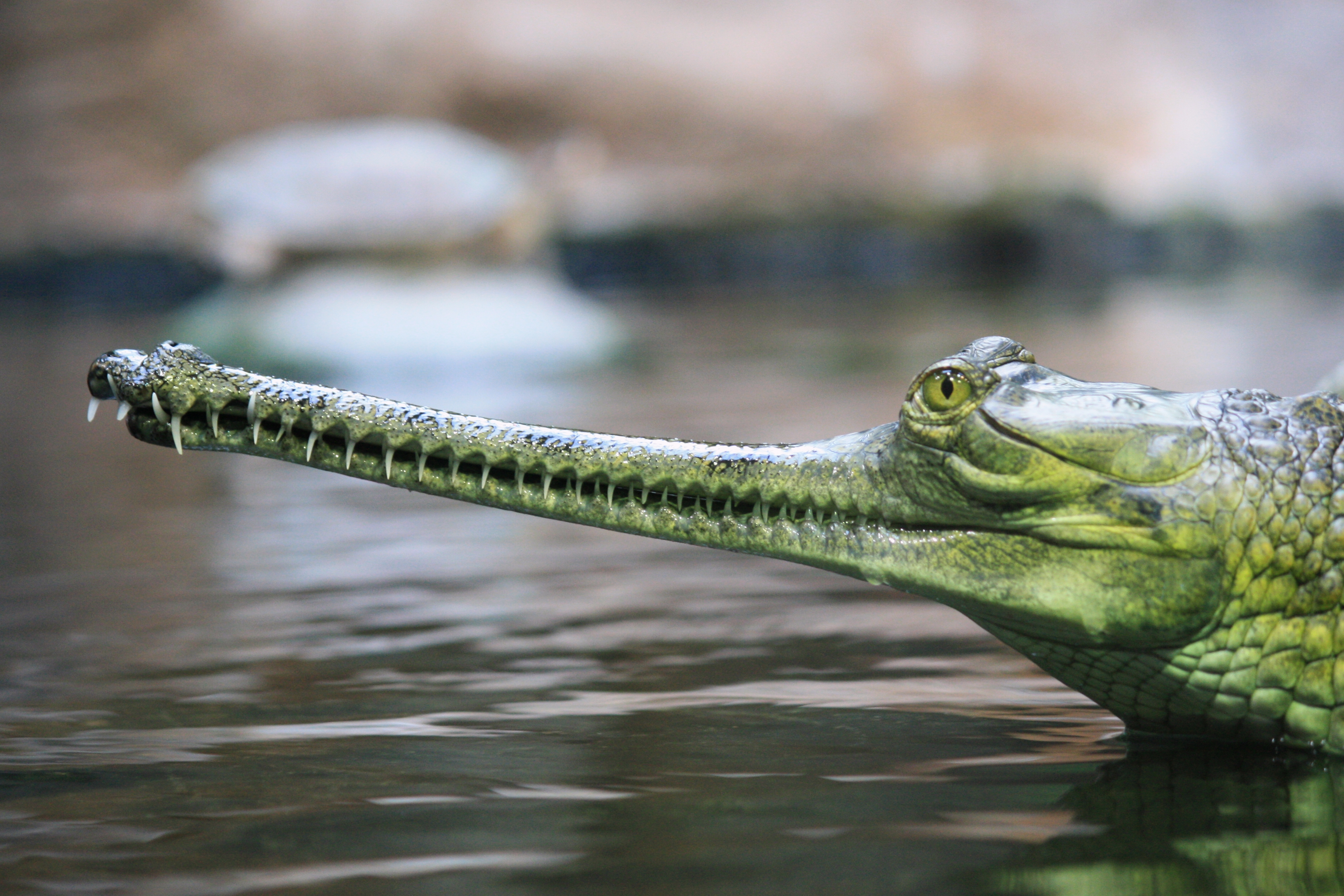
- Gharial, Gavialis gangeticus

Scientific classification
- Kingdom: Animalia
- Phylum: Chordata
- Class: Reptilia
- Order: Crocodylia
- Clade: Longirostres
- Superfamily: Gavialoidea; Hay, 1930

Subgroups
- Gavialidae; †Kentisuchus; †Paratomistoma; †Maroccosuchus; †Dollosuchoides; †Dolichochampsa?; †Herugavialis; †Ocepesuchus; †Pseudogavialis; †"Thoracosaurs"?; †Argochampsa; †Eogavialis; †Eosuchus; †Eothoracosaurus; †Thoracosaurus; †Portugalosuchus?

= Gavialoidea =

Gavialoidea Temporal range: Maastrichtian–Present Possible Cenomanian origin, if "thoracosaurs" are included

Superfamily of large reptiles

Gavialoidea is one of three superfamilies of crocodilians, the other two being Alligatoroidea and Crocodyloidea. Although many extinct species are known, only the gharial Gavialis gangeticus and the false gharial Tomistoma schlegelii are alive today, with Hanyusuchus having become extinct in the last few centuries.

Extinct South American gavialoids likely dispersed in the late Paleogene from Africa and Asia. Fossil remains of the Puerto Rican gavialoid Aktiogavialis puertorisensis were discovered in a cave located in San Sebastián, Puerto Rico and dated to the Oligocene. This individual is thought to have crossed the Atlantic coming from Africa, indicating that this species was able to withstand saltwater.

== Classification ==
Gavialoidea is cladistically defined as Gavialis gangeticus (the gharial) and all crocodylians closer to it than to Alligator mississippiensis (the American alligator) or Crocodylus niloticus (the Nile crocodile). This is a stem-based definition for gavialoids, and is more inclusive than the crown group Gavialidae. As a crown group, Gavialidae only includes the last common ancestor of all extant (living) gavialids and their descendants (living or extinct), whereas Gavialoidea, as a total group, also includes more basal extinct gavialid ancestors that are more closely related to living gavialids than to crocodiles or alligators. When considering only living taxa (neontology), this makes Gavialoidea and Gavialidae synonymous, and only Gavialidae is used. Thus, Gavialoidea is only used in the context of paleontology.

Traditionally, crocodiles and alligators were considered more closely related and grouped together in the taxon Brevirostres, to the exclusion of the gharials. This classification was based on morphological studies primarily focused on analyzing skeletal traits of living and extinct fossil species. However, recent molecular studies using DNA sequencing have rejected Brevirostres upon finding the crocodiles and gavialids to be more closely related than the alligators. The new clade Longirostres was named by Harshman et al. in 2003.

In addition, these recent molecular DNA studies consistently indicate that the false gharial (Tomistoma) (and by inference other related extinct forms) traditionally viewed as belonging to the crocodylian subfamily Tomistominae actually belong to Gavialoidea (and Gavialidae). As its name suggests, the false gharial was once thought to be only distantly related to the gharial despite its similar appearance. The false gharial and other tomistomines were traditionally classified within the superfamily Crocodyloidea as close relatives of crocodiles, based solely on morphological evidence.

The phylogenetic position group of Late Cretaceous-Cenozoic longirostrine eusuchians dubbed the "thoracosaurs" is controversial. Traditionally they are considered to be members of Gavialoidea, but some studies have recovered them as non crocodilian eusuchians.

A 2018 tip dating study by Lee & Yates simultaneously using morphological, molecular (DNA sequencing), and stratigraphic (fossil age) data interpreted inter-relationships within Crocodilia, which was expanded upon in 2021 by Hekkala et al. using paleogenomics by extracting DNA from the extinct Voay. The tip dating analysis resolved the extinct Thoracosaurus and similar extinct close relatives as outside of Gavialoidea.

The below cladogram shows the results of the latest study, and Gavialoidea's relationships within Crocodylia:

- Crocodylia (crown group)
  - Alligatoroidea (total group)
    - extinct basal Alligatoroids†
    - Alligatoridae (crown group)
      - Caimaninae
        - - Caiman
          - Melanosuchus
        - Paleosuchus
      - Alligatorinae
        Alligator
  - Longirostres (crown group)
    - Crocodyloidea (total group)
      - "Crocodylus" megarhinus†
      - Crocodylidae (crown group)
        - Crocodylus
        - - Mecistops
          - Osteolaemus
    - Gavialoidea (total group)
      - Kentisuchus†
      - - - Maroccosuchus†
          - Paratomistoma†
        - - Dollosuchoides†
          - - Tomistoma cairense†
            - Gavialidae (crown group)
              - Gavialis
              - Tomistoma

However, other analyses by different authors have continued to resolve thoracosaurs as members of Gavialoidea.
