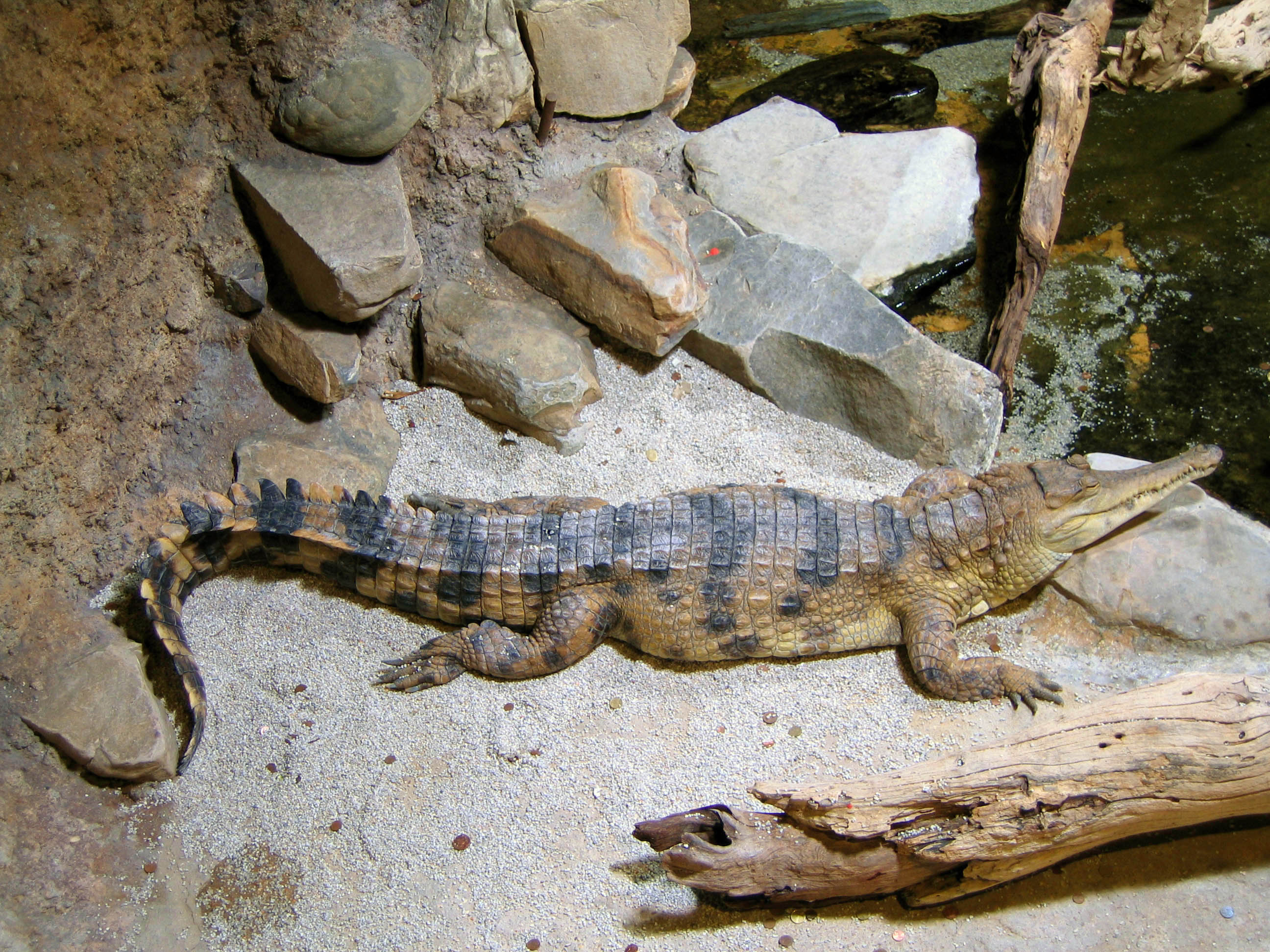
- West African slender-snouted crocodile
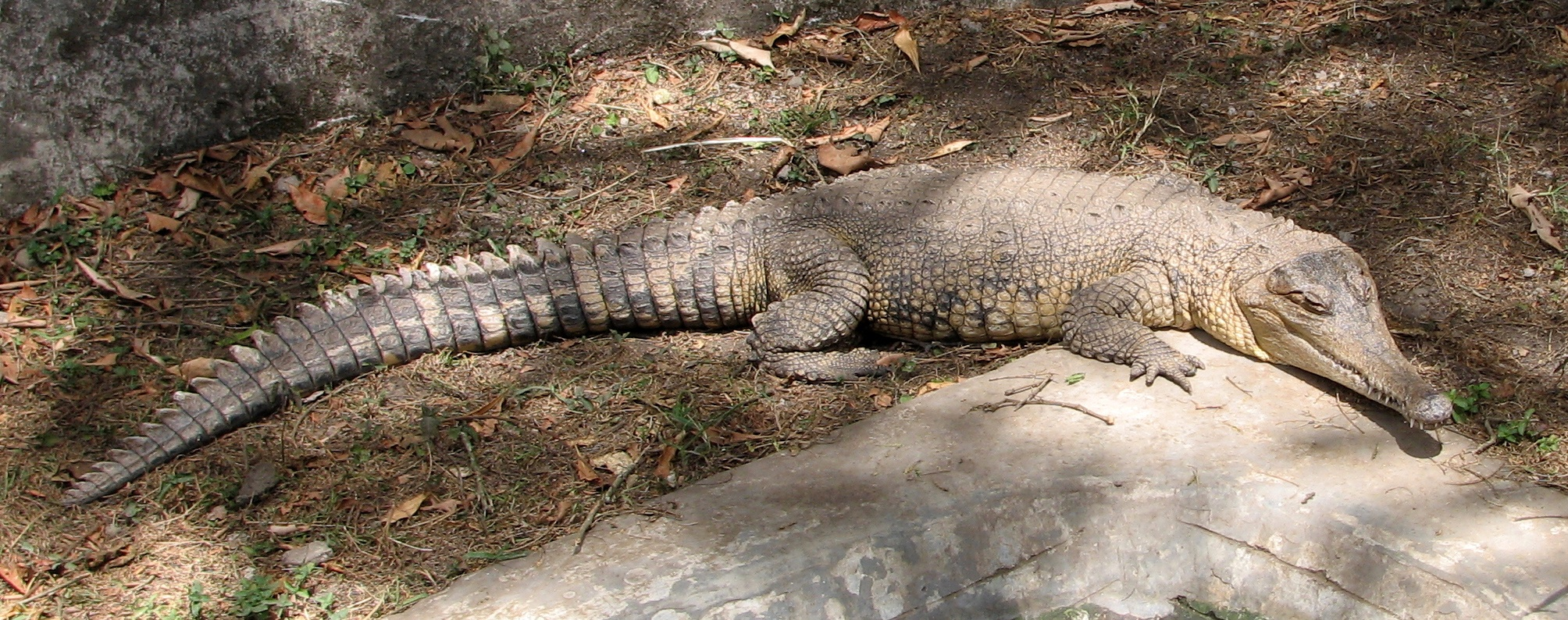
- Central African slender-snouted crocodile

Scientific classification
- Kingdom: Animalia
- Phylum: Chordata
- Class: Reptilia
- Order: Crocodylia
- Family: Crocodylidae
- Subfamily: Osteolaeminae
- Genus: Mecistops; Gray, 1844

Species
- Mecistops cataphractus; Mecistops leptorhynchus
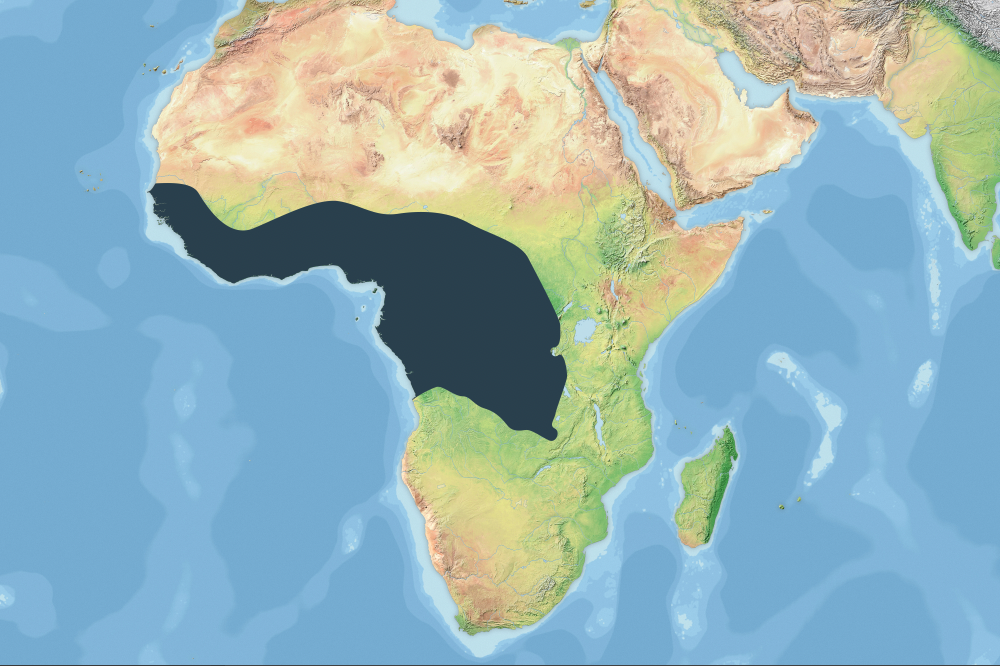
- Range map

= Mecistops =

Mecistops Temporal range: Miocene – Recent, 11.6–0 Ma

Genus of reptiles

Mecistops is a genus of crocodiles, the slender-snouted crocodiles, native to sub-Saharan Africa.

== Taxonomy and etymology ==
Traditionally placed in Crocodylus, recent studies in DNA and morphology have shown that it is in fact basal to Crocodylus, thus was moved its own genus. This genus itself was long considered to contain only one species, M. cataphractus, but recent genetic analysis has revealed the existence of two species: the West African slender-snouted crocodile (M. cataphractus) and the Central African slender-snouted crocodile (M. leptorhynchus). Both species diverged during the Miocene (about 6.5–7.5 million years ago) and are separated by the Cameroon Volcanic Line.

=== Phylogeny ===
The cladogram below is based on two studies that combined morphological and molecular (DNA sequencing) data. Recently recognised species (M. leptorhynchus, C. halli and the third Osteolaemus species) placed according to 2023 study by Sales-Oliveira et al.

- Crocodylidae (crown group)
  - Osteolaeminae
    - - Mecistops
        - Mecistops cataphractus West African slender-snouted crocodile
        - Mecistops leptorhynchus Central African slender-snouted crocodile
      - Euthecodon †
    - - Brochuchus †
      - - Rimasuchus †
        - - - Osteolaemus osborni Osborn's dwarf crocodile
          - - Osteolaemus tetraspis Dwarf crocodile
            - Osteolaemus sp. West
  - Crocodylinae
    - Voay
      Voay robustus †
    - Crocodylus
      - - - Crocodylus anthropophagus †
          - Crocodylus thorbjarnarsoni †
        - - Crocodylus palaeindicus †
          - Crocodylus Tirari Desert †
      - - - - - - Crocodylus johnstoni Freshwater crocodile
            - - - Crocodylus novaeguineae New Guinea crocodile
                - Crocodylus halli Hall's New Guinea crocodile
              - - Crocodylus mindorensis Philippine crocodile
          - - - - Crocodylus porosus Saltwater crocodile
            - - - Crocodylus siamensis Siamese crocodile
              - - Crocodylus palustris Mugger crocodile
        - - - Crocodylus checchiai †
            - Crocodylus falconensis †
          - - - - - - Crocodylus suchus West African crocodile
            - - - - - Crocodylus niloticus Nile crocodile
              - - - - Crocodylus rhombifer Cuban crocodile
                - - - Crocodylus intermedius Orinoco crocodile
                    - Crocodylus acutus American crocodile
                  - - Crocodylus moreletii Morelet's crocodile

Alternatively, other morphological studies have recovered Mecistops as a basal member of Crocodylinae, more closely related to Crocodylus than to Osteolaemus and the other members of Osteolaeminae, as shown in the cladogram below.

- Crocodylidae
  - Osteolaeminae
    - Rimasuchus lloydi†
    - - Voay robustus†
      - - Osteolaemus osborni Osborn's dwarf crocodile
        - Osteolaemus tetraspis Dwarf crocodile
    - - "Crocodylus" gariepensis†
      - - - Brochuchus parvidens†
          - Brochuchus pigotti†
        - - Euthecodon arambourgi†
          - Euthecodon brumpti†
  - Crocodylinae
    - Mecistops cataphractus West African slender-snouted crocodile
    - - - Crocodylus thorbjarnarsoni†
        - Crocodylus anthropophagus†
      - - Crocodylus niloticus Nile crocodile
        - - Crocodylus checchiai†
          - Crocodylus moreletii Morelet's crocodile
          - Crocodylus intermedius Orinoco crocodile
          - Crocodylus acutus American crocodile
          - Crocodylus rhombifer Cuban crocodile
        - Crocodylus palaeindicus†
        - - Crocodylus palustris Mugger crocodile
          - - - Crocodylus ossifragus†
              - Crocodylus siamensis Siamese crocodile
            - - Crocodylus mindorensis Philippine crocodile
              - Crocodylus johnstoni Freshwater crocodile
              - Crocodylus porosus Saltwater crocodile
              - - Crocodylus raninus Borneo crocodile
                - Crocodylus novaeguineae New Guinea crocodile

==== Extant species ====
Genus Mecistops – two species
Common name	Scientific name and subspecies	Range	Size and ecology	IUCN status and estimated population
West African slender-snouted crocodile	Mecistops cataphractus (Cuvier, 1825)	Benin, Burkina Faso, southern Senegal, Gambia, Ghana, Guinea, Guinea-Bissau, Ivory Coast, Liberia, southern Mali, Nigeria, Sierra Leone, and Togo	Size: Habitat: Diet:	CR
Central African slender-snouted crocodile	Mecistops leptorhynchus (Bennett, 1835)	Cameroon, Equatorial Guinea, Gabon, northern Angola, Central African Republic, Republic of the Congo, Democratic Republic of the Congo	Size: Habitat: Diet:	

=== Etymology ===
The genus name Mecistops is most probably derived from the Ancient Greek words μήκιστ (mēkist), meaning "longest", and ὄψ (óps) meaning "face".

== Description ==
Slender-snouted crocodiles are native to freshwater habitats in central and western Africa. They prefer highly vegetated bodies of water to hide from prey and potential predators. They are medium-sized crocodiles, typically slightly smaller than the Nile crocodile, but are larger than several other species of crocodilians. Adults are typically about 2.5 m (8.2 ft) long, but have been known to reach 4.2 m (14 ft). They weigh between 125 and 325 kg (276 and 717 lb). Males are significantly larger than females. They have a slender snout used for catching prey, hence their name. They are incredibly shy and adversely impacted by human disturbance.

== Behavior ==
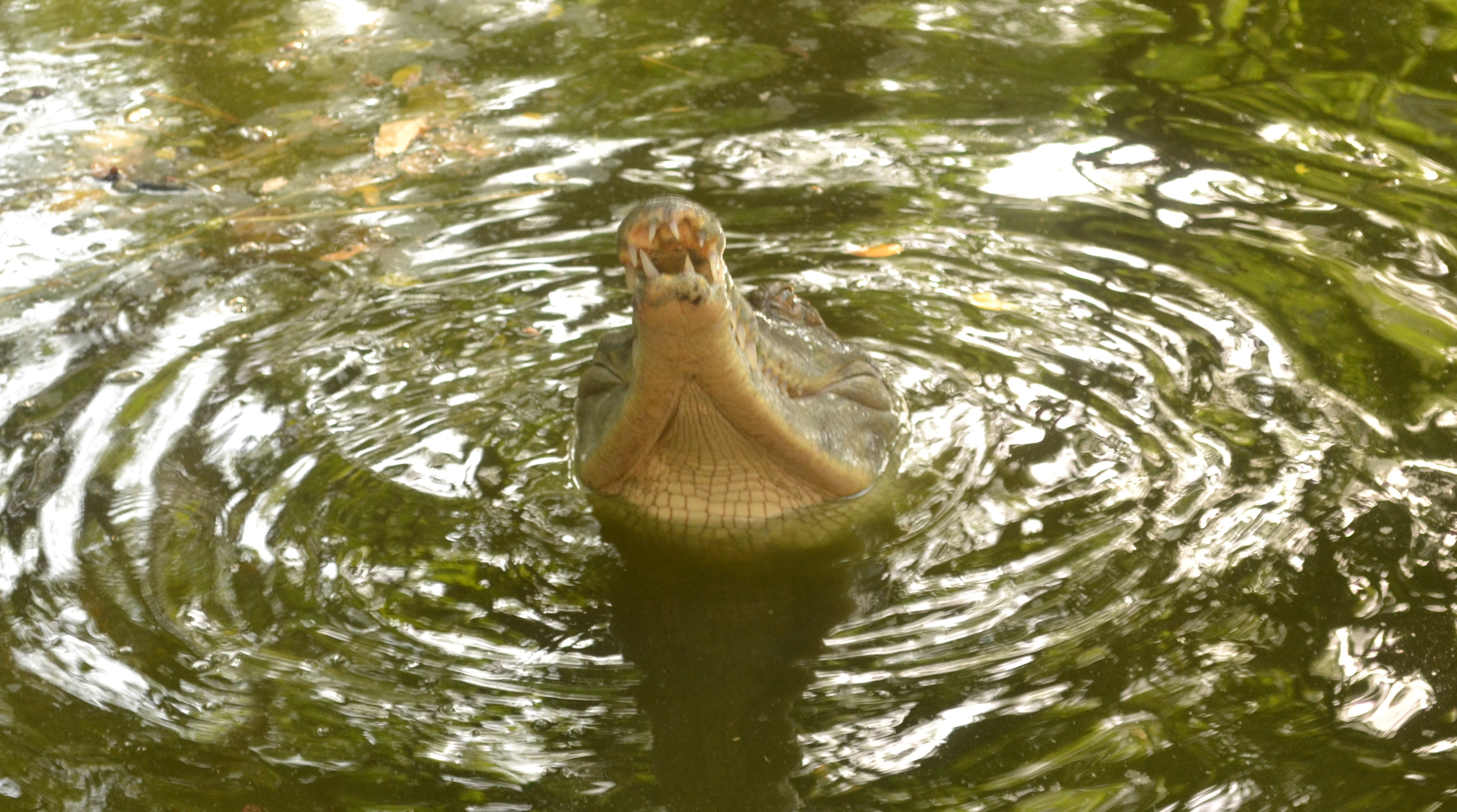
Slender-snouted crocodiles bear a superficial resemblance to gharials, which also have a very slender snout

The diet of the slender-snouted crocodile consists mainly of fish, amphibians, and crustaceans. Typically, they can be found basking on land. Adults occasionally take smaller mammals, aquatic snakes, turtles, and birds. Both species in the genus are not typically found in groups, except during the onset of the breeding season. The female constructs a mound nest consisting mainly of plant matter. The nests are usually 50 to 60 cm high and 1 to 2 m in diameter. Nests are placed on the banks of rivers, and construction generally begins at the onset of the wet season, although breeding is asynchronous even within members of one population. It has a similar, but generally shorter nesting season than that of the sympatric dwarf crocodile, which may nest further from the riverine habitat frequented by Mecistops. The breeding season begins in January or February and lasts until July.

Slender-snouted crocodiles lay an average of 16 (minimum 13, maximum 27) very large eggs (relative to body size) about a week after completion of the mound nest. The nests are constructed out of decaying vegetation. The incubation period is long compared with most other crocodilian genera, sometimes lasting over 110 days. The average incubation for female offspring is 90 to 100 days and for males is usually 85 to 86 days. The female remains close to the nest, but does not defend it with the same vigor as some other crocodilians. Once the eggs begin to hatch, and the juveniles emit their characteristic chirping, she breaks open the nest and assists in the hatching process. Hatchlings then disperse across the flooded forest floor. Although losses from predators do occur (e.g. by soft-shelled turtles), they apparently are minimal, possibly accounting for the small number of relatively large eggs laid, and the long incubation period. The sex of the eggs is determined by temperature. Females are produced between 28 and 31 °C. Males are produced between 31 and 33 °C. The maximum temperature that the eggs are able to withstand is 34 °C and produce females. Sex is determined between day 14 and 21. The mothers help the offspring hatch if they can not do so themselves. Hatchlings are precocious and mimic a smaller version of the parents. They also have very sharp teeth for protection.

This genus has good hearing, eyesight, and smell. Throughout the body of crocodiles, sensory pits are present, which have nerve terminals inside. The two types of these sensory pits are integumentary sense organs that cover the body and papillae that cover the head, primarily around the snout. When under water, crocodile have a "third eyelid" called a nictitating membrane, which is present in many other reptiles, but is unique in crocodiles because it is semitransparent and acts as goggles to improve eyesight when hunting and prevents eye damage. Crocodiles are able to make certain sounds, especially juveniles. Hatchling crocodiles are able to indicate when they will hatch by making a vocalization that can be heard by the mother. Crocodiles can make coughing, hissing, and bellowing vocalizations usually when feeling threatened.

== Conservation ==
Both species in the genus have been studied very little, in part due to their remote habitat. However, M. cataphractus (when it contained both the West African and Central African populations) has been classified as critically endangered by the IUCN. Threats include hunting (skin and bushmeat), habitat loss, overfishing (they mainly feed on fish), and general disturbance. Both species have been entirely extirpated from several countries where formerly present, and have declined elsewhere. However, the Central African species retains a relatively robust population, especially in Gabon. There is considerable uncertainty about the size of the wild population, but it is estimated that between 1,000 and 20,000 remain. Slender-snouted crocodiles are kept and bred at a number of zoos in Europe and North America, and the Ivory Coast has started a captive-breeding program.
