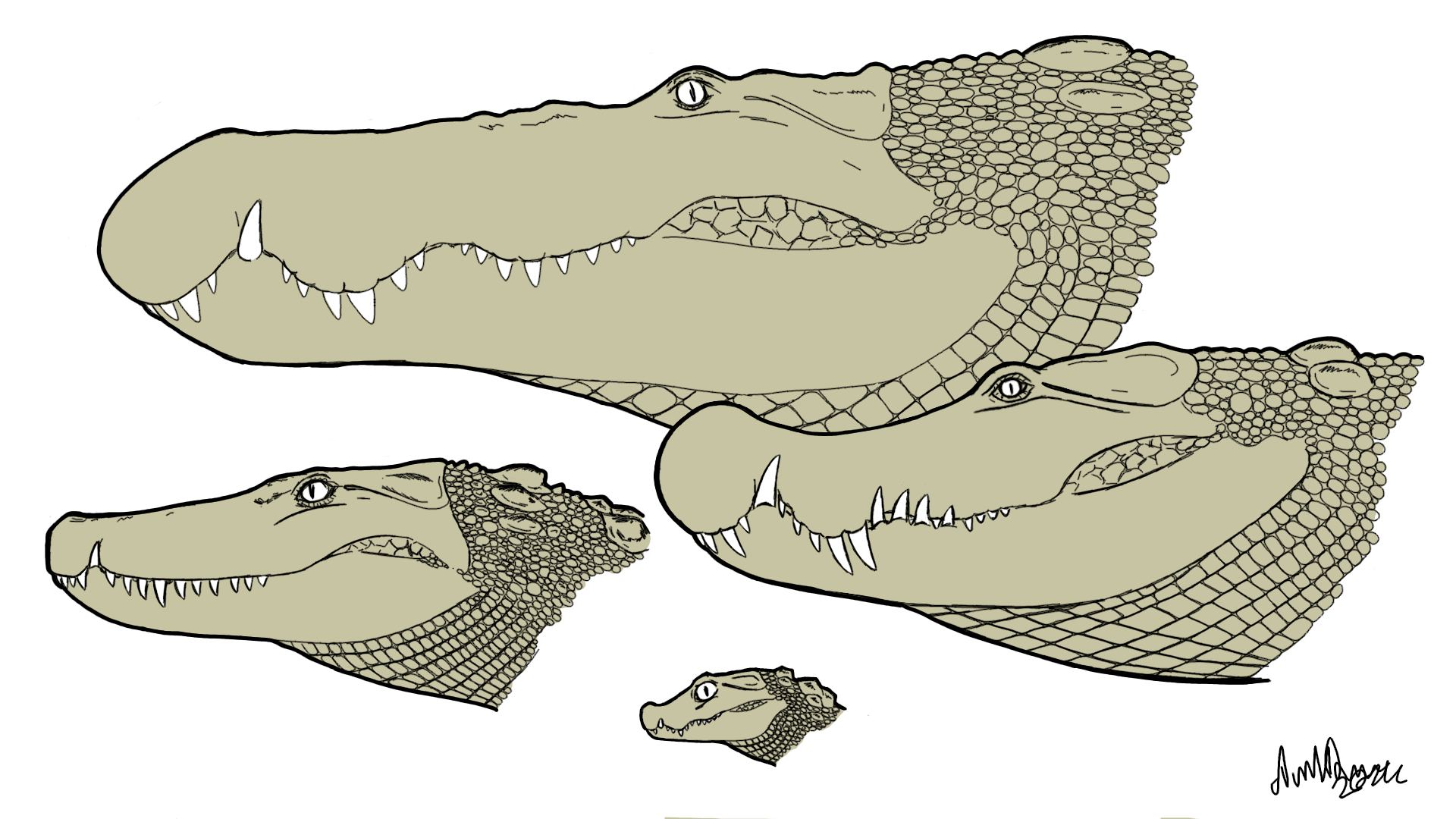
- Four members of Mekosuchinae, clockwise from top: Paludirex, Baru, Mekosuchus and Quinkana

Scientific classification
- Kingdom: Animalia
- Phylum: Chordata
- Class: Reptilia
- Order: Crocodylia
- Superfamily: Crocodyloidea
- Clade: †Mekosuchinae; Willis, Molnar & Scanlon, 1993

Type species
- †Mekosuchus inexpectatus Balouet & Buffetaut, 1987

Genera
- †Australosuchus; †Baru; †Kalthifrons; †Kambara; †Mekosuchus; †Paludirex; †Quinkana; †Trilophosuchus; †Ultrastenos; †Volia

= Mekosuchinae =

Mekosuchinae Temporal range: Eocene - Holocene, 56–0.003 Ma

Extinct subfamily of reptiles

Mekosuchinae is an extinct clade of crocodilians from the Cenozoic of Australasia. They represented the dominant group of crocodilians in the region during most of the Cenozoic, first appearing in the fossil record in the Eocene of Australia, and surviving until the arrival of humans: the Late Pleistocene on the Australian continent and during the Holocene in the Pacific islands of Fiji, New Caledonia and Vanuatu.

Mekosuchine crocodiles are a diverse group displaying a great variety of shapes and sizes. Some taxa, like Baru and Paludirex, were large semi-aquatic ambush hunters, though the two genera likely differed significantly in their hunting methods. The medium-sized Australosuchus may have been relatively cold-resistant and taxa like Trilophosuchus and Mekosuchus are renowned for their small size. One of the most distinct mekosuchines was Quinkana, with its altirostral (deep) skull and blade-like serrated teeth.

There is some question around the lifestyle of mekosuchines. Based on skull shape, many taxa are semi-aquatic and most mekosuchines have relatively conservative hip morphology, although other factors might indicate greater terrestrial capabilities. The humeri are straighter than in modern crocodiles, allowing them to perform the so-called "highwalk" more easily. Mekosuchus and Trilophosuchus are commonly regarded as more terrestrial, perhaps similar to dwarf caimans and dwarf crocodiles, while Quinkana displays a skull shape very similar to terrestrial crocodylomorphs like sebecids and planocraniids. In the case of Quinkana, this interpretation is mostly hindered by the near complete lack of postcranial material, with the exception of some isolated hip bones which suggest the presence of a mekosuchine with erect limbs in the Riversleigh World Heritage Area, where Quinkana was found.

Mekosuchines were historically considered to be true crocodiles (of the family Crocodylidae), but modern research favors the idea that they either diverged before the split between gharials and crocodiles or that they are a sister group to Crocodylidae. Some recent studies have even played with the idea that Orientalosuchina, a clade of small crocodilians from the Cretaceous to Paleogene of Asia, might be a part of Mekosuchinae. Regardless of their origins, mekosuchines rapidly diversified between their first appearance during the Eocene and the Oligocene-Miocene boundary, when as many as five different genera of very different morphology all inhabited the freshwater environments and forests of the Riversleigh.

Mekosuchines underwent a decline in post-Miocene Australia, with most genera believed to have gone extinct due to an especially severe period of aridification. While mekosuchines recovered during the Pliocene, the continuous decline of inland freshwater systems and the associated terrestrial biomes gradually lead to the decline of the family. By the Pleistocene only the genera Quinkana and Paludirex still inhabited mainland Australia, alongside the more recent true crocodiles. After the demise of the last mainland mekosuchines, the group survived on Fiji, Vanuatu and New Caledonia until the Holocene. In all instances the extinction of mekosuchines happens around roughly the same time as the arrival of humans, though it is unclear how much of a part, if any, they played in these events. For the mainland taxa it is argued that their disappearance was mostly related to climate change, with the pattern of extinction matching the disappearance of river basins but less so with the appearance of humans. Things are more complex for the island forms, with some researchers questioning how much Mekosuchus and humans truly overlapped. If humans played a role in the extinction of the last mekosuchines, it could have been either directly due to overhunting or more indirectly through habitat destruction and invasive species like rats.

== History of discovery ==
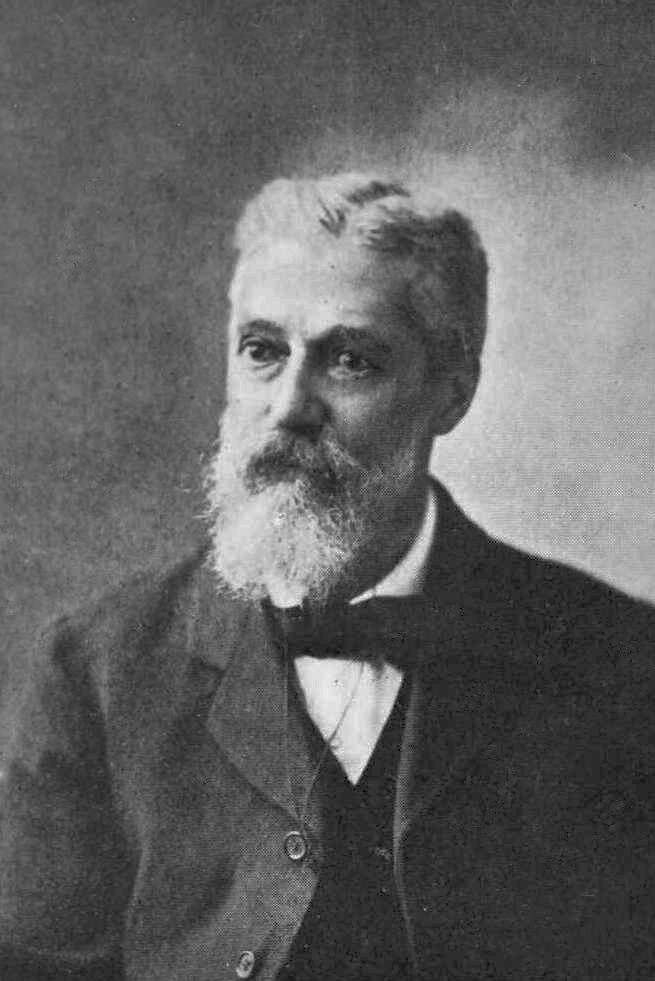
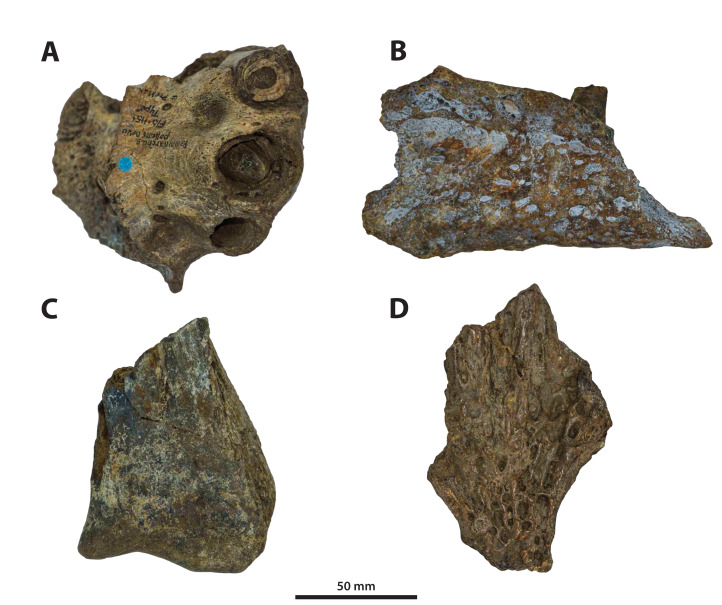
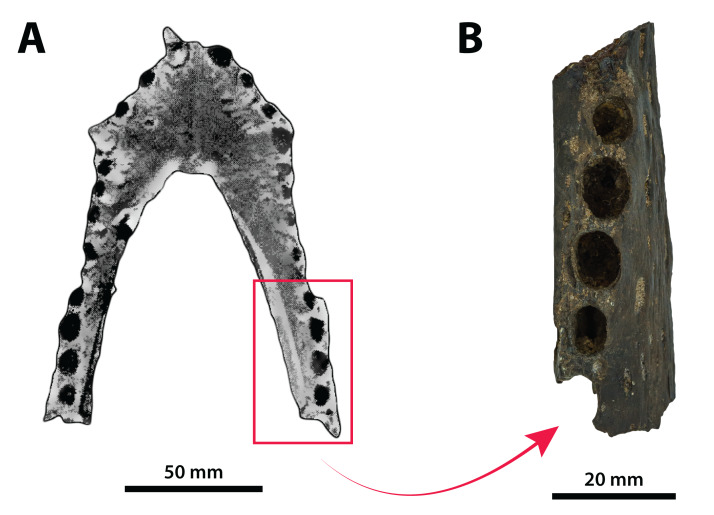
De Vis (left) and the material used to coin the name Pallimnarchus (right, bottom).

=== Early finds ===
Although the family Mekosuchinae was not established until the 1990s, fossil material belonging to members of this clade had been known from the Australian continent for a long time. The first material now recognised as belonging to this group of crocodilians was described in 1886 by English zoologist Charles Walter De Vis. The fossils, discovered in the Darling Downs in Queensland, consisted of skull and postcranial fragments that De Vis dubbed Pallimnarchus pollens. De Vis himself only coined the name "out of convenience", admitting that he was too unfamiliar with the Cenozoic crocodilian fossil record to be certain that his find represented an animal distinct from any other taxa known at the time. Later research has even shown that the material belonged not only to multiple individuals but multiple different genera, with various bones since then having been referred to Paludirex and Quinkana respectively. Regardless of De Vis' caution regarding the taxon, the name Pallimnarchus eventually came to be widely used by other authors.

=== Renaissance ===
Despite these early finds, research on genera that we now classify as mekosuchines would grow quiet during the first half of the 20th century, with the lack of published research focused on Australasian crocodilians during the middle of the century leading to a 40-year hiatus. This period would come to an end in 1977 with the publications of Max Hecht, Michael Archer and Ralph Molnar, all of which reported on fossil material collected from cave deposits in northern Queensland. This material encompassed both more fragmentary remains as well as better preserved ones, including a nearly complete rostrum recovered from the Tea Tree Cave. The material was quickly noted for its distinct morphology, bearing some resemblance to terrestrial crocodylomorphs like sebecosuchians and planocraniids. Following the discovery of even more fossil fragments, the taxon was named Quinkana in 1981, though early interpretations linked it to the Paleogene planocraniids rather than the already established Pallimnarchus.

In 1982, just a year later, Molnar published a paper focused on Pallimnarchus, attempting to revise the genus by establishing a lectotype specimen to compensate for the fact that De Vis did not establish a holotype. Around the same time, reports of crocodilian fossil material came out of New Caledonia, these leading to the description of Mekosuchus by French paleontologists Jean-Christophe Balouet and Eric Buffetaut in 1987. Like with Quinkana, the distinct morphology of Mekosuchus initially obscured its relationship to modern crocodilians, with the team placing it in the newly named family Mekosuchidae, which they placed as an early branch of Eusuchia and the sister group to the three extant groups of crocodilians (crocodiles, gharials, alligators and caiman).

=== Recent work ===
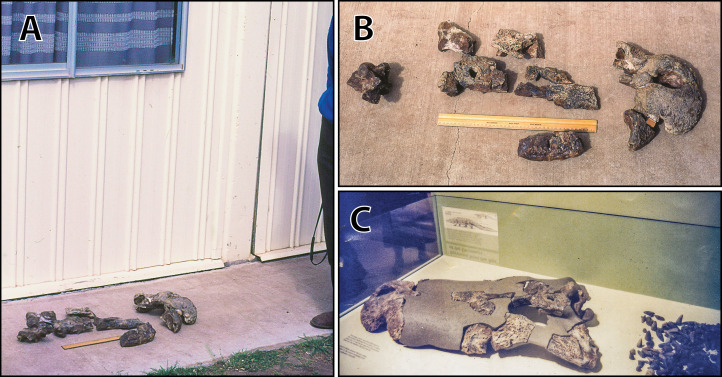
Geoff Vincent's specimen was instrumental in the redescription of Pallimnarchus as Paludirex.

The 1970s and 1980s set the groundwork for what would be a period of increased interest in Australasian crocodilians during the 1990s and early 2000s. In addition to Hecht, Archer and Molnar, a variety of other authors would publish on crocodile fossil material during this time, many of which going on to become quite prolific in the study of mekosuchines. These include Paul Willis, Steven Salisbury and Dirk Megirian. Following the description of Baru, scientists began to recognize shared traits among the fossil crocodiles of Australia, with Willis and colleagues proposing the presence of what they dubbed the Australian Tertiary crocodylian radiation. This concept initially included the three mainland taxa Baru, Quinkana and Pallimnarchus and was later expanded to include Australosuchus as well, named a year later in 1991.

The concept of the Australian Tertiary crocodylian radiation would come to be replaced by the subfamily Mekosuchinae in 1993, defined by Willis, Molnar and John Scanlon as a subfamily of the Crocodylidae. The name was intentionally carried over from the monotypic Mekosuchidae of Balouet and Buffetaut, with Willis and colleagues meaning to preserve the seniority of the name while adapting it to more accurately reflect their supposed position among crocodilians at the time. In terms of composition, the only new taxa included were Kambara, named in the same paper, and Mekosuchus, the namesake of the clade. Other mekosuchines recognized during the 1990s were Trilophosuchus, named not long after the family was described in 1993, as well as three additional species of Quinkana, two species of Baru, and one species each of Kambara, Pallimnarchus, and Mekosuchus.

This trajectory more or less carried over into the 2000s and 2010s, seeing the description of two more Kambara species, two more Mekosuchus species were described, alongside entirely new genera such as Volia, Kalthifrons, and Ultrastenos. Another spike in research occurred during the late 2010s and early 2020s with the publication of multiple papers helmed by Jorgo Ristevski, whose work includes a complete overhaul of the genus Pallimnarchus, coining the new name Paludirex in its place to bring stability to the taxon, two studies on the cranium of Trilophosuchus, and a summary of Australasian crocodylian research co-authored with several other researchers previously involved in mekosuchine research. 2023 saw the description of Baru iylwenpeny, previously only known as the "Alcoota Baru", while the year 2024 saw a reinterpretation of Ultrastenos, concluding that it was synonymous with "Baru" huberi.

== Species ==
Genus	Species	Age	Location	Notes	Image
Australosuchus	A. clarkae	Late Oligocene - Early Miocene	South Australia	Australosuchus is known from abundant remains; it was likely a semi-aquatic generalist and had a moderately broad and flattened skull. It is among the southern-most members of its family and has been hypothesized to have been much more cold resistant than its relatives, allowing it to thrive in areas where others could not.	Australosuchus
Baru	B. darrowi	Middle Miocene	Queensland Northern Territory	Species of Baru are among the largest and most robust mekosuchines, bearing heavily built skulls with large and finely crenulated teeth. Having reached lengths upwards of 4 m (13 ft), they were the apex predators of Miocene freshwater habitats. Baru is sometimes known as the "cleaver-headed crocodile".	Baru species
Baru	B. iylwenpeny	Late Miocene	Northern Territory	Species of Baru are among the largest and most robust mekosuchines, bearing heavily built skulls with large and finely crenulated teeth. Having reached lengths upwards of 4 m (13 ft), they were the apex predators of Miocene freshwater habitats. Baru is sometimes known as the "cleaver-headed crocodile".	Baru species
Baru	B. wickeni	Late Oligocene	Queensland Northern Territory	Species of Baru are among the largest and most robust mekosuchines, bearing heavily built skulls with large and finely crenulated teeth. Having reached lengths upwards of 4 m (13 ft), they were the apex predators of Miocene freshwater habitats. Baru is sometimes known as the "cleaver-headed crocodile".	Baru species
Kalthifrons	K. aurivellensis	Pliocene	South Australia	Kalthifrons was a medium-sized mekosuchine found on the shores of Lake Palankarinna in South Australia. It is generally thought to have been a semi-aquatic generalist similar to modern crocodilians. It has been hypothesized that it might have either been outcompeted by the genus Crocodylus or that the latter filled the same niche following the extinction of Kalthifrons in the Lake Eyre Basin.	Kalthifrons skull reconstruction
Kambara	K. implexidens	Eocene	Queensland	All four known species of Kambara lived during the Eocene in what is now Queensland, with at least two of them possibly having coexisted. The different species chiefly differ in how their teeth occlude, with K. murgonensis possessing an overbite akin to an alligator whereas other species appear more similar to crocodiles in possessing interlocking teeth. Although fossil remains are numerous, most material of Kambara has never been properly described.	Kambara skulls
Kambara	K. molnari	Eocene	Queensland	All four known species of Kambara lived during the Eocene in what is now Queensland, with at least two of them possibly having coexisted. The different species chiefly differ in how their teeth occlude, with K. murgonensis possessing an overbite akin to an alligator whereas other species appear more similar to crocodiles in possessing interlocking teeth. Although fossil remains are numerous, most material of Kambara has never been properly described.	Kambara skulls
Kambara	K. murgonensis	Eocene	Queensland	All four known species of Kambara lived during the Eocene in what is now Queensland, with at least two of them possibly having coexisted. The different species chiefly differ in how their teeth occlude, with K. murgonensis possessing an overbite akin to an alligator whereas other species appear more similar to crocodiles in possessing interlocking teeth. Although fossil remains are numerous, most material of Kambara has never been properly described.	Kambara skulls
Kambara	K. taraina	Eocene	Queensland	All four known species of Kambara lived during the Eocene in what is now Queensland, with at least two of them possibly having coexisted. The different species chiefly differ in how their teeth occlude, with K. murgonensis possessing an overbite akin to an alligator whereas other species appear more similar to crocodiles in possessing interlocking teeth. Although fossil remains are numerous, most material of Kambara has never been properly described.	Kambara skulls
Mekosuchus	M. inexpectatus	Holocene	New Caledonia	Among the smallest mekosuchines, Mekosuchus was a long lived genus that first appeared during the Late Oligocene on mainland Australia and may have died out as recently as 3,000 years ago, if not more recently still. Mekosuchus is among the most enigmatic members of its group, with no strong consensus on what kind of lifestyle it had. A more terrestrial lifestyle is commonly suggested and sometimes the genus is likened to modern dwarf-crocodiles, which inhabit small rainforest streams.	Mekosuchus spp
Mekosuchus	M. kalpokasi	Holocene	Vanuatu	Among the smallest mekosuchines, Mekosuchus was a long lived genus that first appeared during the Late Oligocene on mainland Australia and may have died out as recently as 3,000 years ago, if not more recently still. Mekosuchus is among the most enigmatic members of its group, with no strong consensus on what kind of lifestyle it had. A more terrestrial lifestyle is commonly suggested and sometimes the genus is likened to modern dwarf-crocodiles, which inhabit small rainforest streams.	Mekosuchus spp
Mekosuchus	M. sanderi	Early Miocene	Queensland	Among the smallest mekosuchines, Mekosuchus was a long lived genus that first appeared during the Late Oligocene on mainland Australia and may have died out as recently as 3,000 years ago, if not more recently still. Mekosuchus is among the most enigmatic members of its group, with no strong consensus on what kind of lifestyle it had. A more terrestrial lifestyle is commonly suggested and sometimes the genus is likened to modern dwarf-crocodiles, which inhabit small rainforest streams.	Mekosuchus spp
Mekosuchus	M. whitehunterensis	Late Oligocene - Early Miocene	Queensland	Among the smallest mekosuchines, Mekosuchus was a long lived genus that first appeared during the Late Oligocene on mainland Australia and may have died out as recently as 3,000 years ago, if not more recently still. Mekosuchus is among the most enigmatic members of its group, with no strong consensus on what kind of lifestyle it had. A more terrestrial lifestyle is commonly suggested and sometimes the genus is likened to modern dwarf-crocodiles, which inhabit small rainforest streams.	Mekosuchus spp
Paludirex	P. gracilis	Late Pleistocene	Queensland	The genus Paludirex was established as a substitute for the poorly defined genus Pallimnarchus and is represented by two species. Among these, the larger P. vincenti is the single largest mekosuchine, reaching an estimated body length of around 5 m (16 ft), although the smaller P. gracilis still reached lengths comparable to those of Baru.	Paludirex species
Paludirex	P. vincenti	Pliocene - Pleistocene?	Queensland	The genus Paludirex was established as a substitute for the poorly defined genus Pallimnarchus and is represented by two species. Among these, the larger P. vincenti is the single largest mekosuchine, reaching an estimated body length of around 5 m (16 ft), although the smaller P. gracilis still reached lengths comparable to those of Baru.	Paludirex species
Quinkana	Q. fortirostrum	Pleistocene	Queensland	Quinkana possessed an altirostral skull and ziphodont dentition, leading scientists to compare it to sebecids and planocraniids, although none of them are closely related to each other. This has led to the hypothesis that Quinkana was a primarily terrestrial animal, although no postcranial material has been confidently assigned to the genus to confirm this.	Quinkana holotype specimens
Quinkana	Q. babarra	Early Pliocene	Queensland	Quinkana possessed an altirostral skull and ziphodont dentition, leading scientists to compare it to sebecids and planocraniids, although none of them are closely related to each other. This has led to the hypothesis that Quinkana was a primarily terrestrial animal, although no postcranial material has been confidently assigned to the genus to confirm this.	Quinkana holotype specimens
Quinkana	Q. meboldi	Late Oligocene	Queensland	Quinkana possessed an altirostral skull and ziphodont dentition, leading scientists to compare it to sebecids and planocraniids, although none of them are closely related to each other. This has led to the hypothesis that Quinkana was a primarily terrestrial animal, although no postcranial material has been confidently assigned to the genus to confirm this.	Quinkana holotype specimens
Quinkana	Q. timara	Middle Miocene	Northern Territory	Quinkana possessed an altirostral skull and ziphodont dentition, leading scientists to compare it to sebecids and planocraniids, although none of them are closely related to each other. This has led to the hypothesis that Quinkana was a primarily terrestrial animal, although no postcranial material has been confidently assigned to the genus to confirm this.	Quinkana holotype specimens
Trilophosuchus	T. rackhami	Oligocene - Miocene	Queensland	Measuring an estimated 70–90 cm (28–35 in) in length, Trilophosuchus is the smallest known mekosuchine. Described from a partial skull showing three distinct crests running down the skull table, Trilophosuchus shows signs of having been a more terrestrial animal that held its head higher than most modern taxa.	Trilophosuchus
Ultrastenos	U. huberi	Late Oligocene	Queensland	Ultrastenos has a complex history that is split between two names. The snout was initially described under the name Baru huberi, while the skull table was given the name Ultrastenos willisi, only for researchers to later determine that both belonged to a single individual. Because of this, initial reconstructions depicted it as similar to a gharial, which was later proven to be incorrect.	Ultrastenos 2024
Volia	V. athollandersoni	Pleistocene	Fiji	Volia was a medium-sized insular mekosuchine endemic to the island of Fiji, where it lived during the Pleistocene. At 2–3 m (6 ft 7 in – 9 ft 10 in) in length, it was the largest predator on the island and likely fed on flightless birds and giant iguanas.	Volia

Though sometimes included within Mekosuchinae, the Miocene taxon Harpacochampsa is regarded as a type of gavialoid in recent research.

=== Unnamed forms ===
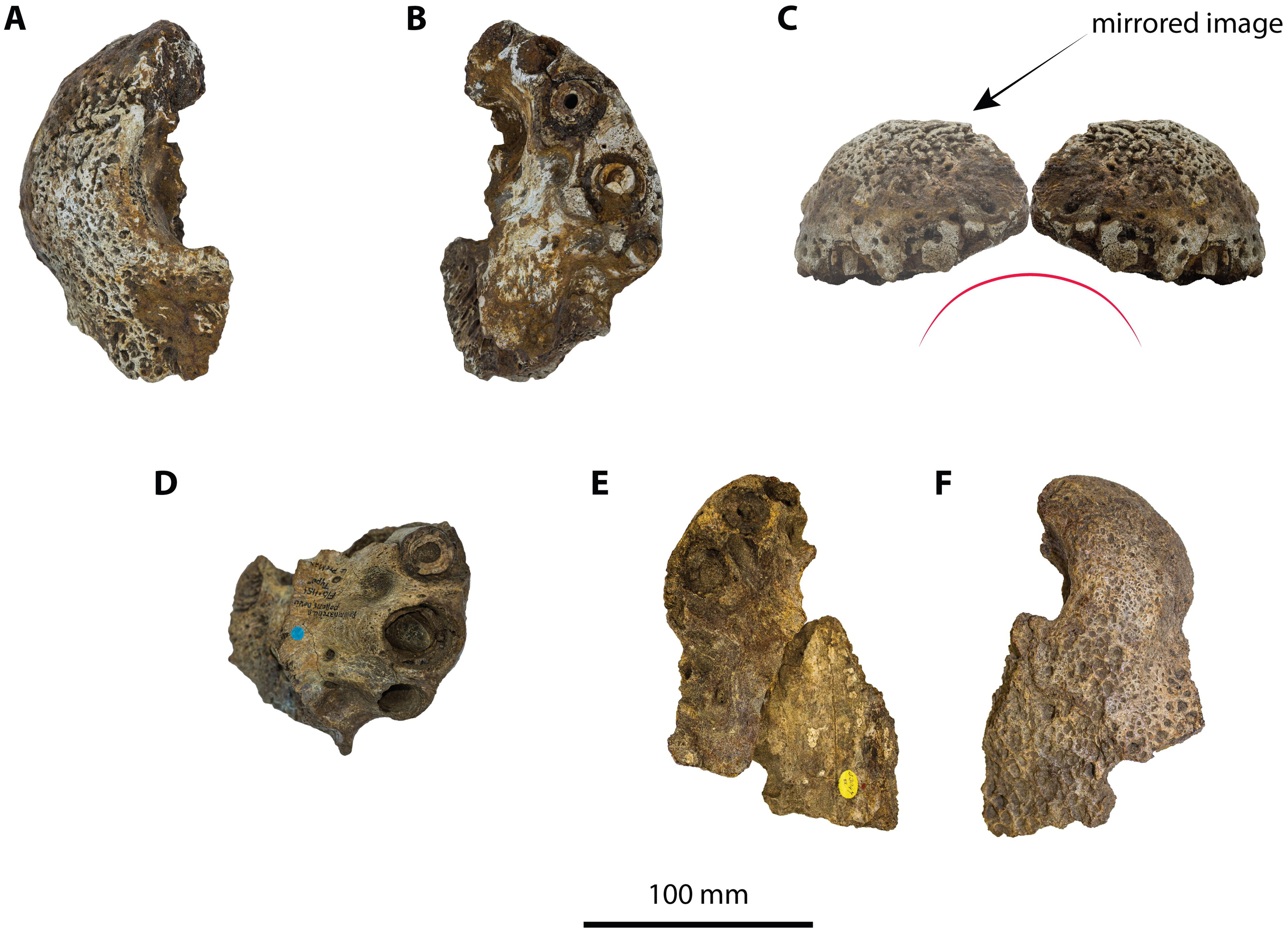
The as of yet unnamed "Darling Downs taxon".

In addition to the many named genera and species, scientists also recognize a plethora of distinct taxa that have not been scientifically described or named yet. Among these is the so-called "Darling Downs taxon", which is represented by multiple bone fragments that bear some resemblance to species of the genus Paludirex while also being visibly distinct from both named species. While too fragmentary to conclusively assign to the genus or erect as a new species, the material has been tentatively regarded as a third species of Paludirex, with the possibility that it might be a different genus altogether. Another example would be the "Bullock Creek taxon", a small mekosuchine long known to share affinities with Ultrastenos and which likely belongs to the genus, but as of yet unnamed.

Unnamed species are also known for the genus Quinkana, notably in the form of the Ongeva Quinkana from Alcoota. The "Floraville taxon", meanwhile, may represent a separate genus of ziphodont mekosuchine rather than another Quinkana species. Ziphodont crocodilian teeth have also been recovered from Australia's Mount Etna Caves National Park.

Remains of a ziphodont crocodilian have been known from the Pliocene Otibanda Formation of Papua New Guinea since 1967, but were initially referred to Sebecosuchia before the discovery of ziphodont mekosuchines. Given that they were not figured nor described in detail, the affinities of these teeth remained largely mysterious in the following 50 years. This changed in late 2024, when the teeth were described in greater detail by Ristevski, Molnar and Yates. The study identifies the remains as ?Mekosuchinae gen. et sp. indet., reasoning that the geography and age would be very unusual for any of the other Cenozoic ziphodont crocodylomorph, yet its morphologically not possible to distinguish it from sebecosuchians or planocraniids. Similarly, it's not possible to distinguish it from species of the genus Quinkana until a better understanding of the variation between ziphodont crocodilian teeth is achieved.

Another geographically significant putative mekosuchine is the "Bannockburn Formation taxon", a crocodilian that lived in New Zealand during the Early Miocene. While the material is too fragmentary to be tested for mekosuchine affinities, field work near St. Bathans has recovered more material that could help resolve the matter. Additionally, these finds also seem to suggest that at least two different crocodilians inhabited New Zealand during this time period.

Much like the "Bannockburn Formation taxon", the "Runcorn taxon" (named after a suburb of Brisbane) is too fragmentary to be conclusively assigned to Mekosuchinae, but is often speculated to have been a part of the group regardless, with Paul Willis even suggesting it may have been a species of Kambara.

== Description ==
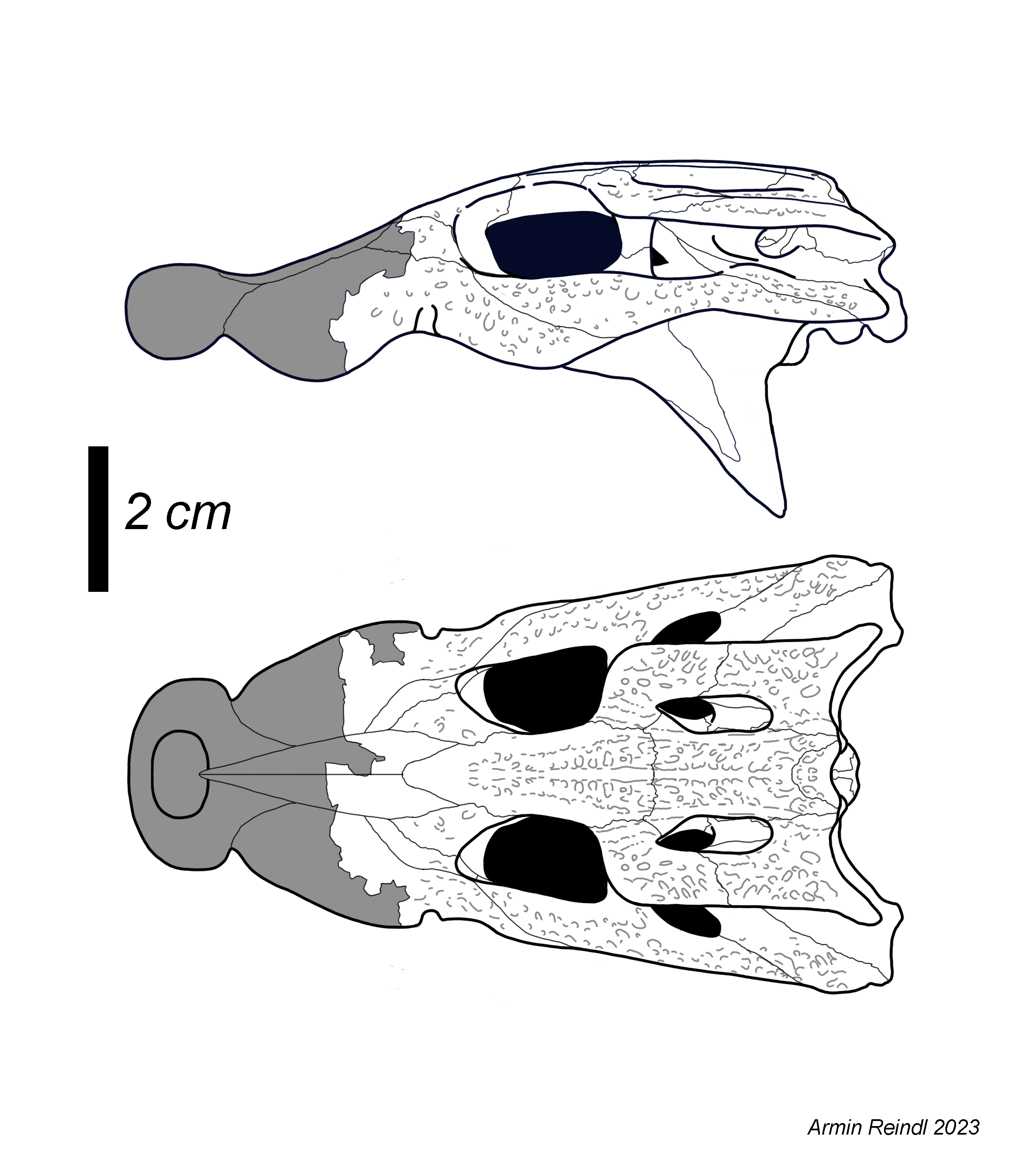
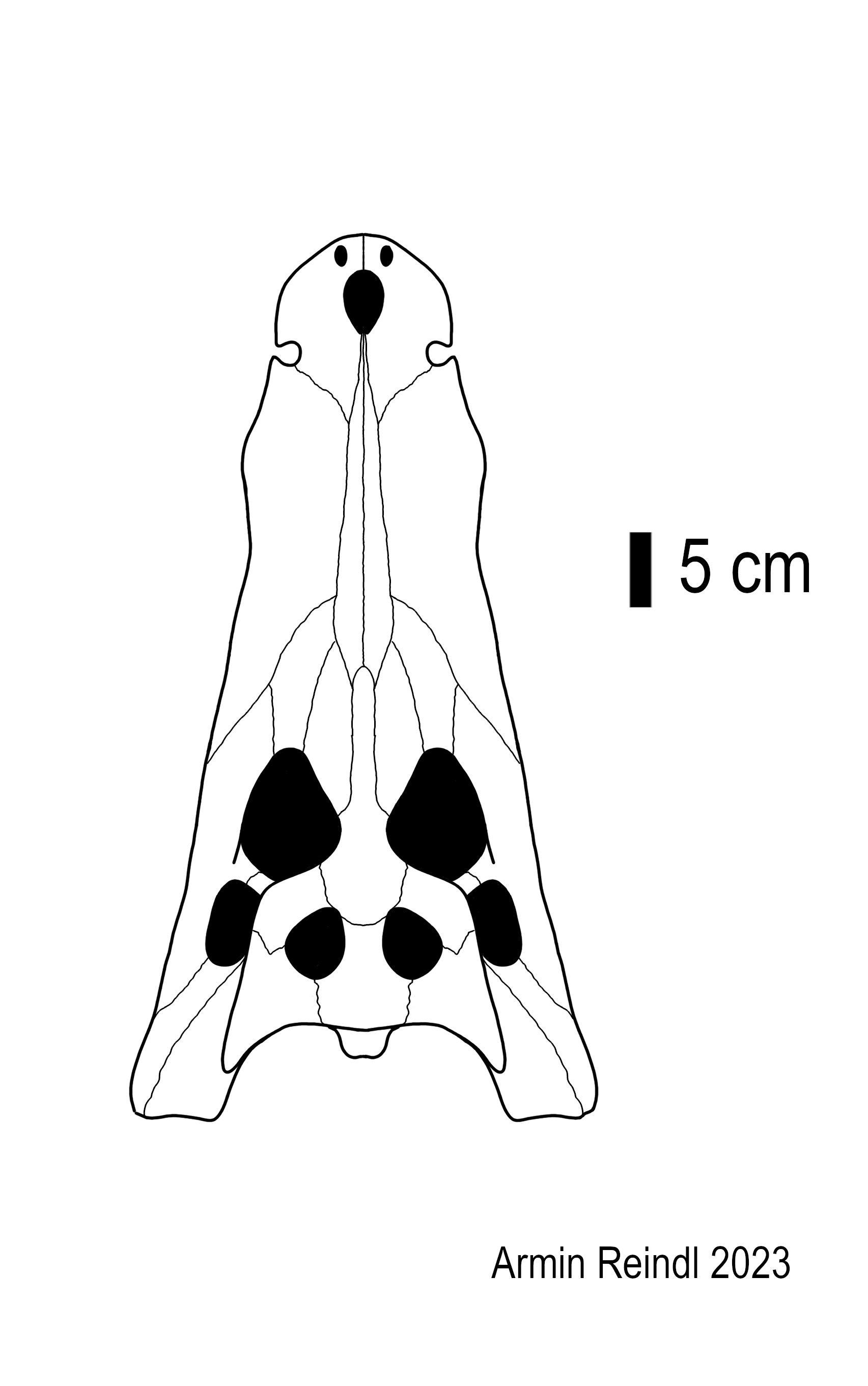
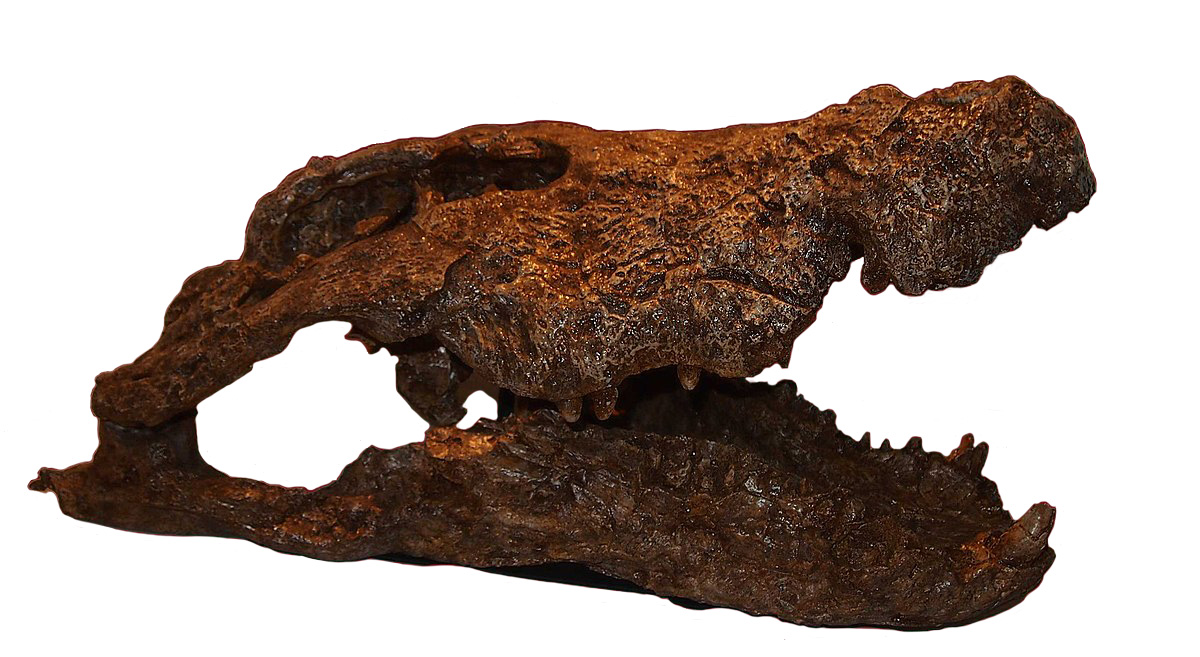
Mekosuchines were a diverse group, featuring animals with short, boxy skulls; platyrostral generalists and robust macropredators.

=== Skull shape ===
One of the most noticeable traits of mekosuchines is the wide range of skull shapes found across the family. At their simplest mekosuchines greatly resemble modern crocodiles, with taxa such as Kambara, Ultrastenos, and Australosuchus having triangular platyrostral skulls, meaning that they are flattened, with both the nostrils and eyes mostly facing upwards. The specifics of this morphotype differ among taxa, as seen between the contemporary Kambara implexidens with its relatively narrow snout and the much more wide-snouted K. murgonensis. As with many modern crocodilians, the skulls feature various degrees of festooning, which describes the patterns of constriction that give the rostrum a somewhat sinuous outline. Especially prominent is a notch formed just behind the premaxillae that received the fourth tooth of the lower jaw when the jaws were closed. In this regard, Australosuchus stands out in having this fourth dentary tooth almost entirely enclosed, with the notch being more accurately described as a semi-enclosed pit. Another deviation from the platyrostral morphotype is seen in Paludirex, which, although still platyrostral, has a much deeper and more robust skull shape with a rostrum that is proportionally much wider than that of other platyrostral mekosuchines.

Members of the genus Baru combine the wedge-shaped triangular skull and strong festooning seen in many generalist forms with a more altirostral skull morphology, making their heads much deeper than those of other mekosuchines. The festooning is especially strong in Baru and the teeth are described as enlarged and laterally compressed. The teeth of two of the species, B. darrowi and B. iylwenpeny, bear fine serrations along the cutting edges of the teeth. This led some early publications to refer to them as ziphodont, although later papers prefer the term "crenulated" to distinguish them from truly ziphodont teeth.

True ziphodonty, as well as an even more developed altirostral skull, are hallmarks of the genus Quinkana. Like in Baru, the skull of Quinkana is distinctly trapezoid in cross-section and noticeably deeper than those of more generalized mekosuchines and modern crocodiles. The skull of Quinkana is generally compared to those of sebecosuchians and planocraniids, with that of Q. fortirostrum distinctly broader and resembling the former and that of Q. timara being closer to the latter. Festooning is almost nonexistent in Q. fortirostrum, with the lower margin of the rostrum almost straight, save for a notch behind the premaxilla. The teeth are blade-like, laterally compressed and ziphodont in most species, the carinae being adorned by a series of prominent serrations. Unlike the crenulations seen in Baru, the denticles that form the serrations on Quinkana teeth are separated by distinct sulci. The number of denticles differs, with Q. timara having finer serrations due to having more denticles relative to Q. fortirostrum, while Q. meboldi lacks them altogether.

The fourth major skull morphotype seen in mekosuchines is displayed by the dwarf taxa Trilophosuchus and Mekosuchus and also falls into the category of altirostry, while at the same time being shortened (brachycephalic). These taxa had boxy skulls with large eyes that bear some resemblance to dwarf caimans and dwarf crocodiles, as well as extinct animals like Theriosuchus, Protosuchus and various notosuchians. No teeth are known from Trilophosuchus, while the teeth of Mekosuchus seem to have had different morphologies depending on the species. The continental M. whitehunterensis and M. sanderi display blade-like teeth, while at least the posterior teeth of the island species M. inexpectatus were blunt and rounded.

=== Size ===
Mekosuchines come in a wide range of sizes, with the smallest known genus Trilophosuchus measuring an estimated 70–90 cm (28–35 in) long. Trilophosuchus is one of several small-bodied taxa placed in a clade of dwarf and insular mekosuchines, with other notable dwarf taxa including Mekosuchus whitehunterensis, estimated to reach lengths around 60 cm (24 in), Ultrastenos, which possibly reached a length of around 1.5 m (4 ft 11 in), and M. inexpectatus, which has been estimated to have grown to lengths of around 1 m (3 ft 3 in) by Holt and up to 2 m (6 ft 7 in) by Balouet.

Species of Quinkana have been estimated between 1.5 m (4 ft 11 in) for Q. meboldi and 3 m (9.8 ft) for Q. fortirostrum, pushing it into the range of the medium-sized members of the family. Some larger reports exist, but these concern remains that are poorly understood and fragmentary. Other mekosuchines in this range include Kalthifrons, Australosuchus and Kambara, with the latter reaching between 2.5–4 m (8 ft 2 in – 13 ft 1 in) depending on the species.

The largest well understood mekosuchines belong to the genera Baru and Paludirex, reaching lengths of 4 m (13 ft) and 5 m (16 ft) respectively.

== Phylogeny ==
=== Internal relationships ===
Mekosuchinae is cladistically defined as a node-based taxon composed of the last common ancestor of Kambara implexidens, Mekosuchus inexpectatus, and all of its descendants. Beyond this definition, which necessitates the inclusion of Kambara and Mekosuchus in the clade, various different interpretations of the members of the group and their internal relationships exist. These interpretations differ in a multitude of ways, but also share certain topologies. For instance, taxa such as Kambara and Australosuchus are typically regarded as being basal offshoots of the family, sometimes joined by the much younger genus Kalthifrons. Ristevski and colleagues recovered Kalthifrons as the first mekosuchine to split from the clade, followed by Kambara and Australosuchus, in 2023. This is contrasted by a 2023 publication by Yates, Ristevski & Salisbury, who found Kambara and Australosuchus to form their own small clade at the base of the group with Kalthifrons diverging at a slightly later time. Meanwhile, a publication by Lee & Yates in 2018 recovered Australosuchus as the basalmost mekosuchine, followed by Kambara and finding Kalthifrons in a much more derived position among the members of mekosuchinae.

Modern phylogenies commonly see more derived members of the family split among two branches that diverge from another after taxa like Kambara and Australosuchus do. Ristevski et al., 2023, sees the family split into two clades: one containing the large bodied forms Baru, Paludirex and Quinkana; and one clade of insular and dwarf taxa, which features Ultrastenos, Trilophosuchus, Volia and Mekosuchus. Lee and Yates also recovered this split in 2018, although the makeup of the clades differs slightly. In their study, Baru still clades with Paludirex (here still Pallimnarchus), but in place of Quinkana the clade instead includes Kalthifrons. The other clade is likewise similar to what has been recovered by later studies, featuring Ultrastenos (then known as "Baru" huberi and clading with the undescribed Bullock Creek taxon), Volia, Mekosuchus, Trilophosuchus and Quinkana. Yates, Ristevski and Salisbury did not recover this distinct branching of clades in their 2023 study, however, their phylogeny also did not include several taxa present in the other studies.

The phylogenies mentioned above can be seen here:

Lee & Yates, 2018

- - Mekosuchinae
    - Australosuchus†
    - - - Kambara taraina†
        - Kambara implexidens†
      - - Kambara murgonensis†
        - - - - Kalthifrons†
              - Pallimnarchus†
            - - Baru wickeni†
              - - Baru darrowi†
                - Baru Alcoota†
          - - - Bullock Creek taxon†
              - "Baru" huberi†
            - - Volia†
              - - - Mekosuchus inexpectatus†
                  - - Mekosuchus whitehunterensis†
                    - Mekosuchus sanderi†
                - - Trilophosuchus†
                  - - Quinkana meboldi†
                    - - Quinkana timara†
                      - Quinkana fortirostrum†
  - Longirostres

Yates, Ristevski & Salisbury, 2023

- - Crocodyloidea
    - "Crocodylus" megarhinus†
    - - Mekosuchinae
        - - Australosuchus†
          - - Kambara implexidens†
            - Kambara taraina†
            - Kambara murgonensis†
        - - Kalthifrons†
          - - Quinkana timara†
            - - - Mekosuchus whitehunterensis†
                - Mekosuchus sanderi†
              - - Paludirex vincenti†
                - - Baru iylwenpeny†
                  - - Baru darrowi†
                    - Baru wickeni†
      - Crocodylidae

Ristevski et al. (modified by Yates & Stein, 2024)

- - Crocodyloidea
    - "Crocodylus" megarhinus†
    - - Mekosuchinae
        - Kalthifrons aurivellensis†
        - - - Kambara implexidens†
            - - Kambara taraina†
              - Kambara murgonensis†
          - - Australosuchus†
            - - - Ultrastenos†
                - - Trilophosuchus†
                  - - Volia†
                    - - Mekosuchus whitehunterensis†
                      - - Mekosuchus sanderi†
                        - Mekosuchus inexpectatus†
              - - - Paludirex gracilis†
                  - Paludirex vincenti†
                - - - Baru wickeni†
                    - Baru darrowi†
                  - - Quinkana meboldi†
                    - - Quinkana timara†
                      - Quinkana fortirostrum†
      - Crocodylidae

A stark contrast to these comparably similar phylogenies can be found in a 2021 study by Jonathan Rio & Philip D. Mannion. The most notable differences from the above phylogenies are the placements of Australosuchus and Quinkana, neither of which were recovered as mekosuchines in this study. Australosuchus was placed just outside of Crocodylidae and Quinkana was recovered as a proper crocodyline, sister to "Crocodylus" megarhinus. In exchange, the Chinese taxon "Asiatosuchus" nanlingensis was placed within an offshoot of mekosuchinae alongside a paraphyletic Kambara. Other elements are however more similar to the studies of Yates, Ristevski and colleagues. Kambara remains a basal mekosuchine and a distinct dwarf clade can be observed, formed in this case by Mekosuchus, Trilophosuchus and Ultrastenos. Notably, this study predates the 2024 reinterpretation of Ultrastenos and thus also includes "Baru" huberi as a separate taxon, although both fall within the dwarf clade.

- - Mekosuchinae
    - - Kambara implexidens†
      - - Kambara taraina†
        - - Kambara murgonensis†
          - "Asiatosuchus" nanlingensis†
    - - - Baru darrowi†
        - Baru wickeni†
      - - "Baru" huberi†
        - - Trilophosuchus†
          - - Ultrastenos†
            - Mekosuchus whitehunterensis†
            - Mekosuchus sanderi†
            - Mekosuchus inexpectatus†
  - - Australosuchus†
    - Crocodylidae
      - Osteolaeminae
      - Crocodylinae
        - - Quinkana†
          - "Crocodylus" megarhinus†
        - Crocodylus

=== Orientalosuchina ===
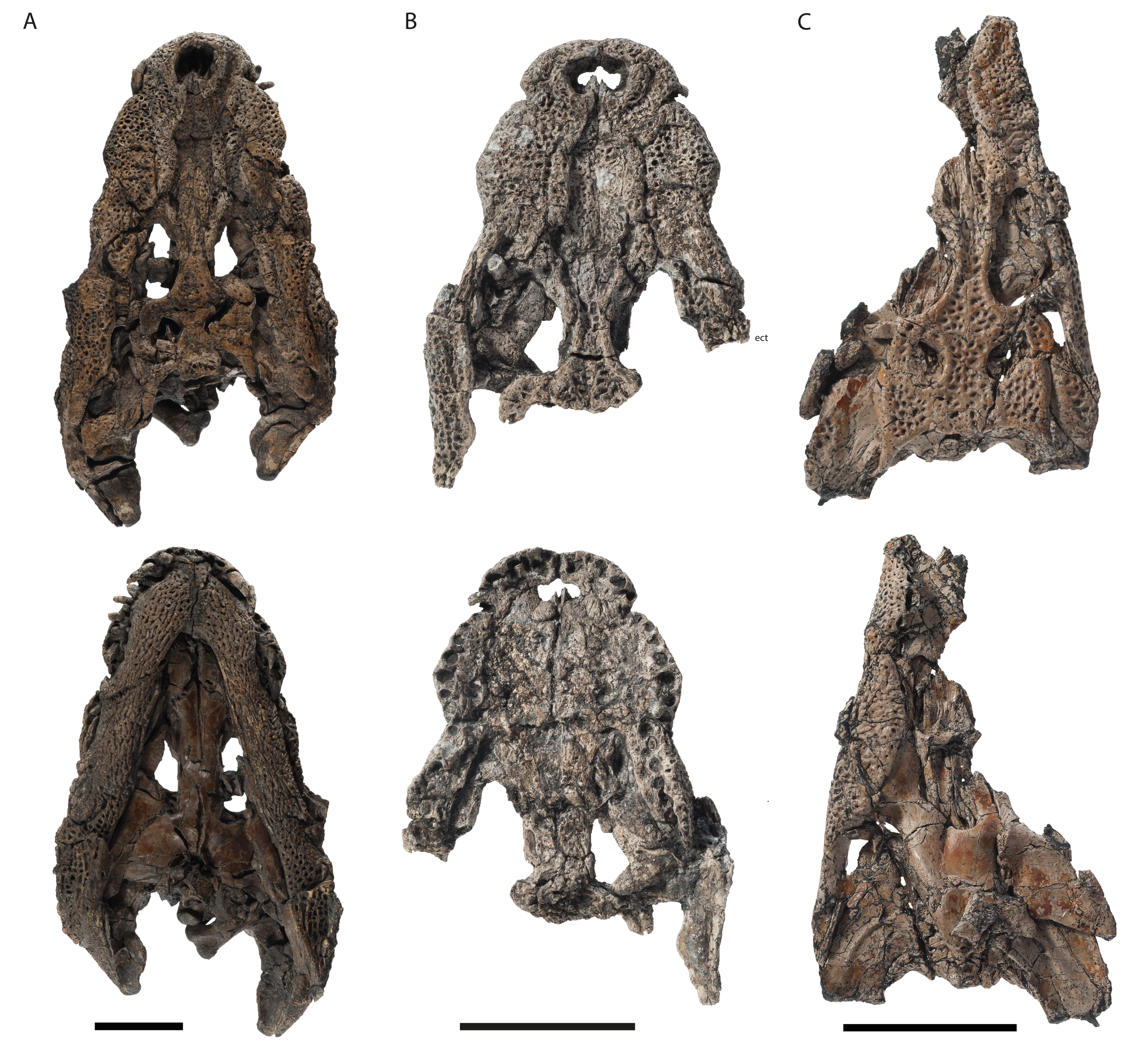
It is possible that the Cretaceous and Paleogene members of Orientalosuchina were relatives of the mekosuchines.

In addition to the more standard topology recovered by Ristevski and colleagues, they also produced two phylogenetic trees that represent the two most novel interpretations of the group. These trees prominently feature the clade Orientalosuchina, crocodilians that lived during the Cretaceous and Paleogene in Asia, as being deeply nested within Mekosuchinae. In both trees Mekosuchinae is divided into two clades, a feature they share with other analyses. The more traditional of these clades includes various medium- to large-sized taxa from continental Australia, namely Kalthifrons, Quinkana, Baru and Paludirex, not dissimilar to the other trees recovered by Ristevski et al.. Meanwhile, the other clade includes Orientalosuchina and small-bodied as well as insular taxa, in other words: Ultrastenos, Trilophosuchus, Volia and Mekosuchus.

Within this topology, orientalosuchins are mostly grouped together to form their own monophyletic clade that acts as the sister-group to the small-bodied mekosuchines. This clade includes the genera Krabisuchus, Orientalosuchus, Jiangxisuchus and Eoalligator, but not Dongnanosuchus, which is closer to the traditional mekosuchine taxa. Protoalligator also wasn't part of the clade, but unlike Dongnanosuchus this is related to the animal being recovered as a basal eusuchian instead of a mekosuchine. Another notable divergence from the traditional interpretation of Mekosuchinae concerns Australosuchus and Kambara, which are both recovered as non-mekosuchines. In addition to changing the internal composition of the clade, the phylogenetic trees recovering Orientalosuchina within Mekosuchinae also shuffle how the group relates to other crocodilians. While mekosuchines as a whole are more distantly related to true crocodiles in these trees, Australosuchus and Kambara remain closely allied to Crocodyloidea. Specifically, Australosuchus is recovered as the basalmost crocodyloid in both analyses, while Kambara was recovered as the direct sister taxon to Crocodylidae.

- Mekosuchinae
  - - Kalthifrons
    - - - Quinkana meboldi
        - - Quinkana fortirostrum
          - Quinkana timara
      - - - Paludirex gracilis
          - Paludirex vincenti
        - - Baru wickeni
          - Baru darrowi
  - - Orientalosuchina
      - Krabisuchus
      - - Orientalosuchus
        - - Jiangxisuchus
          - Eoalligator
    - - Dongnanosuchus
      - - "Baru" huberi
        - - Volia
          - Trilophosuchus
          - - Mekosuchus sanderi
            - Mekosuchus whitehunterensis
            - Mekosuchus inexpectatus

However, there is little evidence that actually supports this grouping. Five possible synapomorphies were identified in the trees that feature Orientalosuchina as members of Mekosuchinae, although none of them are exclusive to these groups nor identified in all included members. Various other morphological features are shared between certain mekosuchines and orientalosuchins as well, but these are also either inconsistently present or widespread amongst crocodilians, especially among alligatoroids. Additionally, the remainder of the eight analyses all recovered a more traditional Mekosuchinae, while members of Orientalosuchina claded with alligatoroids. Ristevski and colleagues conclude that the evidence to support this hypothesis is weak, both phylogenetically and morphologically, but should nonetheless be explored in greater detail.

=== External relationships ===
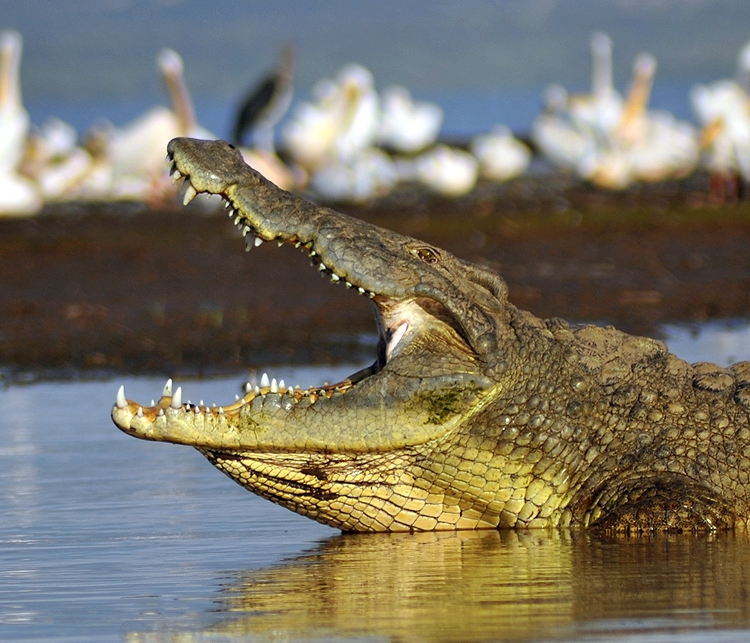
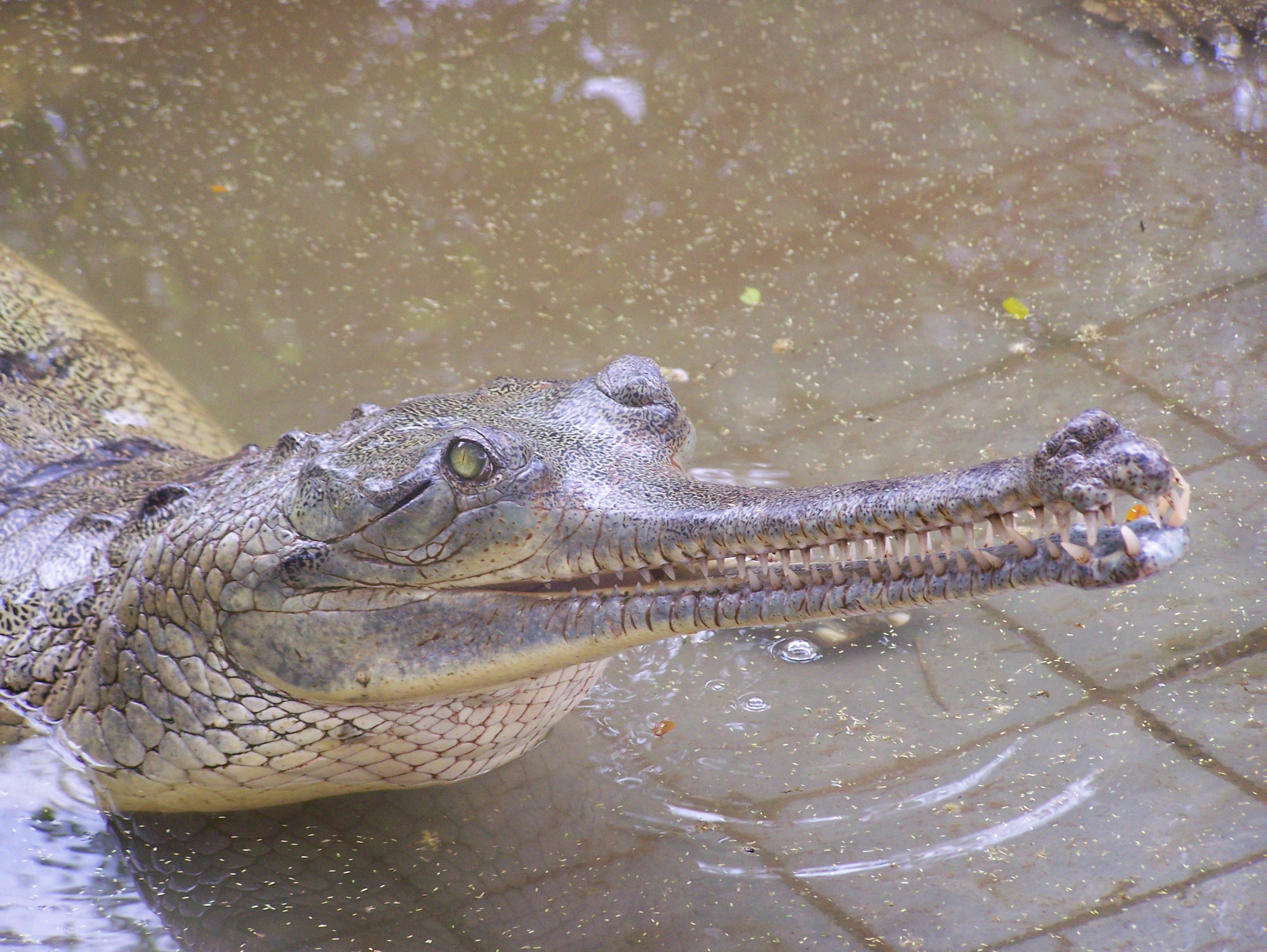
Mekosuchines are either close relatives of true crocodiles or basal to true crocodiles and gharials.

The relationships between mekosuchines and other groups of crocodilians is another matter that has seen repeated shifts across time. When Mekosuchidae was established in 1987 for Mekosuchus, the then monotypic family was placed within Eusuchia. However, around that time crocodile phylogenetics were still poorly studied and Eusuchia was considered a subgroup of Crocodylia, unlike today. By 1993, when Mekosuchinae was coined to include all other Australian Cenozoic crocodilians known at the time, the clade was placed in the family Crocodylidae and regarded as a mere subfamily, a view that remained prominent in literature in subsequent years.

Today however this view is no longer supported, with modern phylogenetic analysis generally agreeing that the clade does not represent a subfamily of crocodylids, but rather a more basal clade. While it is not exactly agreed upon where the group splits off, two main hypotheses exist. In their 2018 study, which incorporates morphological, molecular (DNA sequencing), and stratigraphic (fossil age) data, Lee and Yates recover mekosuchines as the sister group to Longirostres, which is formed by modern gharials (and false gharials) together with true crocodiles. Similar results were yielded by two phylogenetic trees recovered by Ristevski and colleagues in 2023, with the better resolved of the two suggesting that mekosuchines (including Orientalosuchina) split from other crocodilians at some point after planocraniids but before the split between crocodyloids and gavialoids.

The more widely accepted hypothesis is the notion that mekosuchines, while not members of the Crocodylidae itself, are still crocodyloids. Following this hypothesis, which was also recovered by Ristevski et al. in 2023, they are nested deep within Longirostres as the immediate sister group to crocodylids, with the African "Crocodylus" megarhinus as the sister taxon to the clade formed by crocodylids and mekosuchines. The same topology was previously reported by Rio & Mannion in 2021, and was later repeated in a 2023 publication by Yates, Ristevski and Salisbury.

- Crocodylia
  - Alligatoroidea
  - - Planocraniidae†
    - - - Asiatosuchus germanicus†
        - Mekosuchinae†
      - - Prodiplocynodon†
        - - - "Crocodylus" affinis†
            - "Crocodylus" depressifrons†
          - - "Crocodylus" acer†
            - Brachyuranochampsa†
          - Longirostres
            - Gavialoidea
            - Crocodyloidea

- Crocodylia
  - - Borealosuchus spp.†
    - Alligatoroidea
  - - Planocraniidae†
    - - Prodiplocynodon†
      - - - "Crocodylus" affinis†
          - "Crocodylus" depressifrons†
        - - Asiatosuchus germanicus†
          - - - "Crocodylus" acer†
              - Brachyuranochampsa†
            - - Gavialoidea
              - - "Crocodylus" megarhinus†
                - - Mekosuchinae†
                  - Crocodylidae

== Evolutionary history ==
=== Origins ===
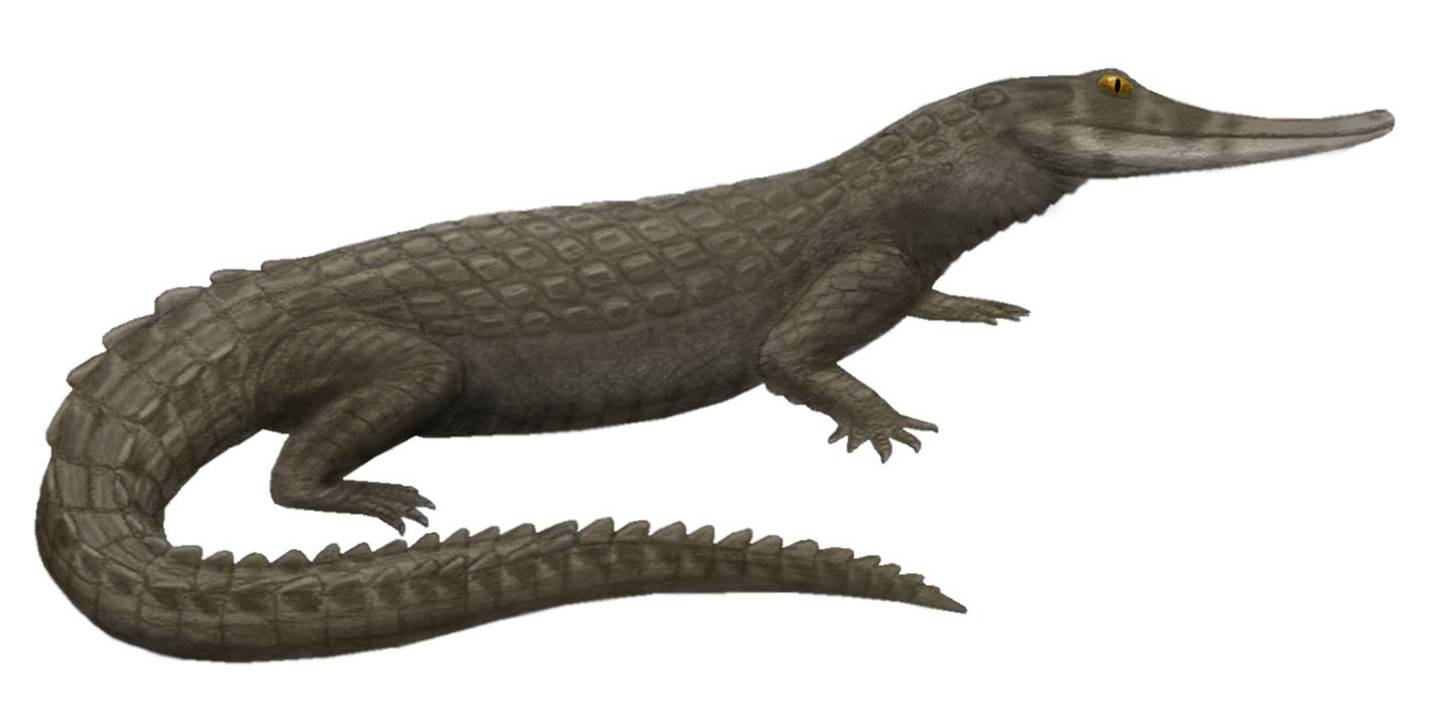
Though the origins of Mekosuchinae is unclear, they were unrelated to the Mesozoic crocodylomorphs of Australia like Isisfordia.

The shifting phylogenetic position of mekosuchines as well as the poor record of crocodylomorph fossils from Australia have long obscured the origins of the clade. The Mesozoic crocodylomorph record from the continent is solely represented by Confractosuchus and Isisfordia which, depending on the publication, may either be highly derived non-eusuchian members of Neosuchia or among the basalmost eusuchians. Regardless, this renders them notably more basal than the later mekosuchines, which are confidently placed among crown crocodilians. Following the most common trees in which orientalosuchins are not mekosuchines, the clade at the latest originated during the late Danian, approximately 66 million years ago and around 10 million years before their first confirmed appearance in the fossil record through Kambara. However, if Orientalosuchina is indeed a subclade of mekosuchines, this would push the origins of the clade back into the Cretaceous.

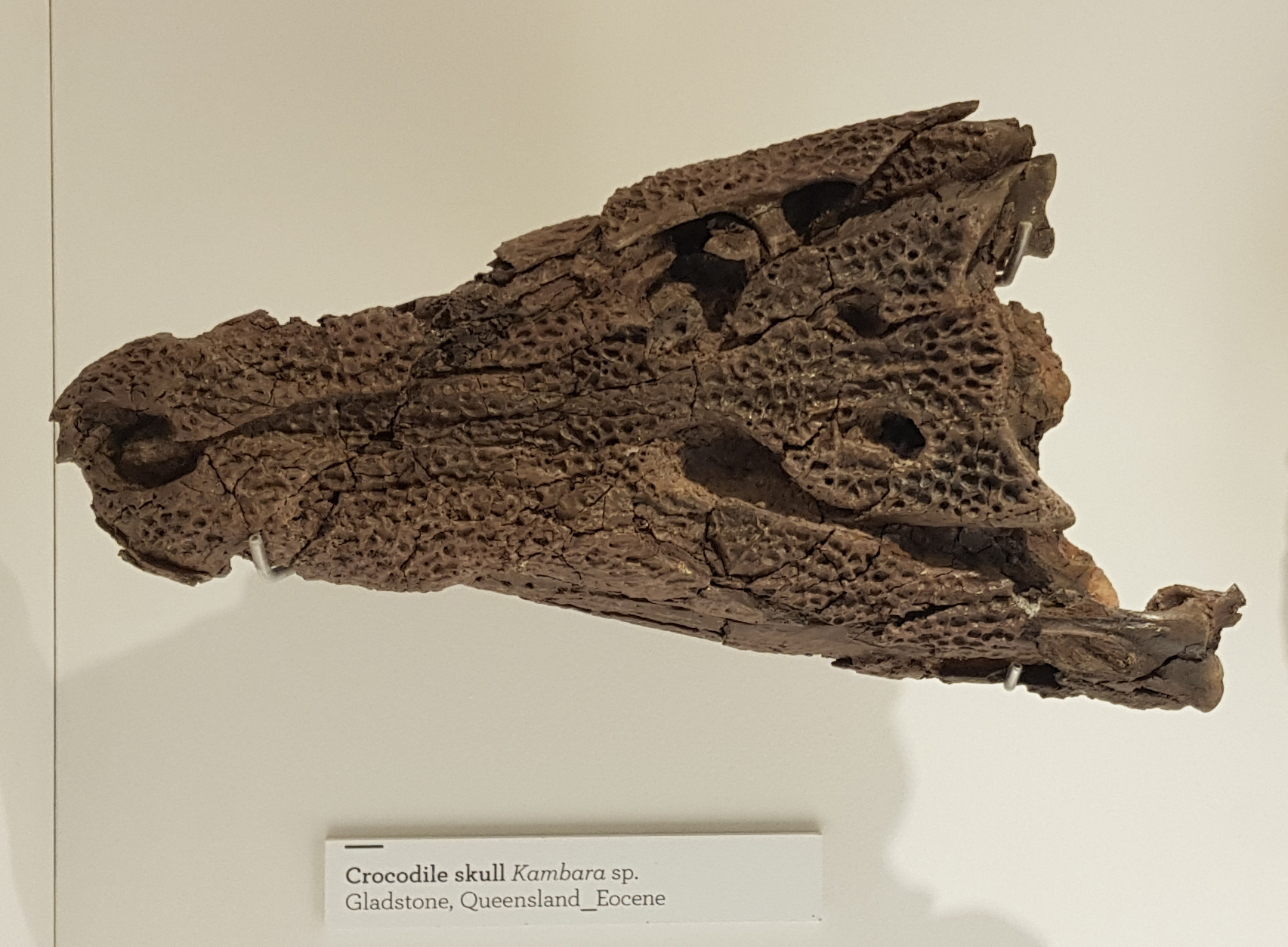
The earliest mekosuchines were likely generalists similar to Kambara.

The second hypothesis in particular would place the origin of the group in Asia, with the earliest mekosuchines then arriving in Australia before the Eocene. However, Ristevski and colleagues note that the gap between the two continents was substantially greater than it is today, meaning that such a journey would have required the crocodiles to traverse large stretches of ocean, or at the very least do a significant amount of island hopping (though the presence of islands in this time period is not certain). This manner of travel would in turn profit from at least some form of osmoregulation being present in early mekosuchines, which is known to be present in gharials and true crocodiles. However, the presence of salt glands as seen in these clades cannot be determined from fossils and with the exception of the insular taxa of the Quaternary all mekosuchines are exclusively known from inland environments. Still, Ristevski and colleagues note that certain extant alligatoroids venture into marine environments, to a lesser extent than true crocodiles, although they lack salt glands. Given that these hypothetical ancestral mekosuchines were likely to have been generalized animals similar to Kambara, it is very possible that they traversed long distances by swimming, possibly with at least some degree of salt tolerance. Hoffman and colleagues for their part note that histology of the long bones of Kambara suggest no evidence that early mekosuchines were any better at transoceanic dispersal than modern forms, but does not rule out rafting or island hopping as previously suggested.

There are still other possibilities for the origin of Mekosuchinae in Australia. For instance, mekosuchines could have hypothetically arrived via land if dispersing from Asia into Europe and then the Americas or directly from Asia into North America. From there, they could have moved to South America, dispersed into Antarctica and entered Australia from the south. However, a key issue with this idea is the complete lack of mekosuchine fossil material from the Americas and Antarctica, rendering dispersal from Asia directly into Australia (or via India) the more likely of the two origins.

=== Diversification and faunal shift ===
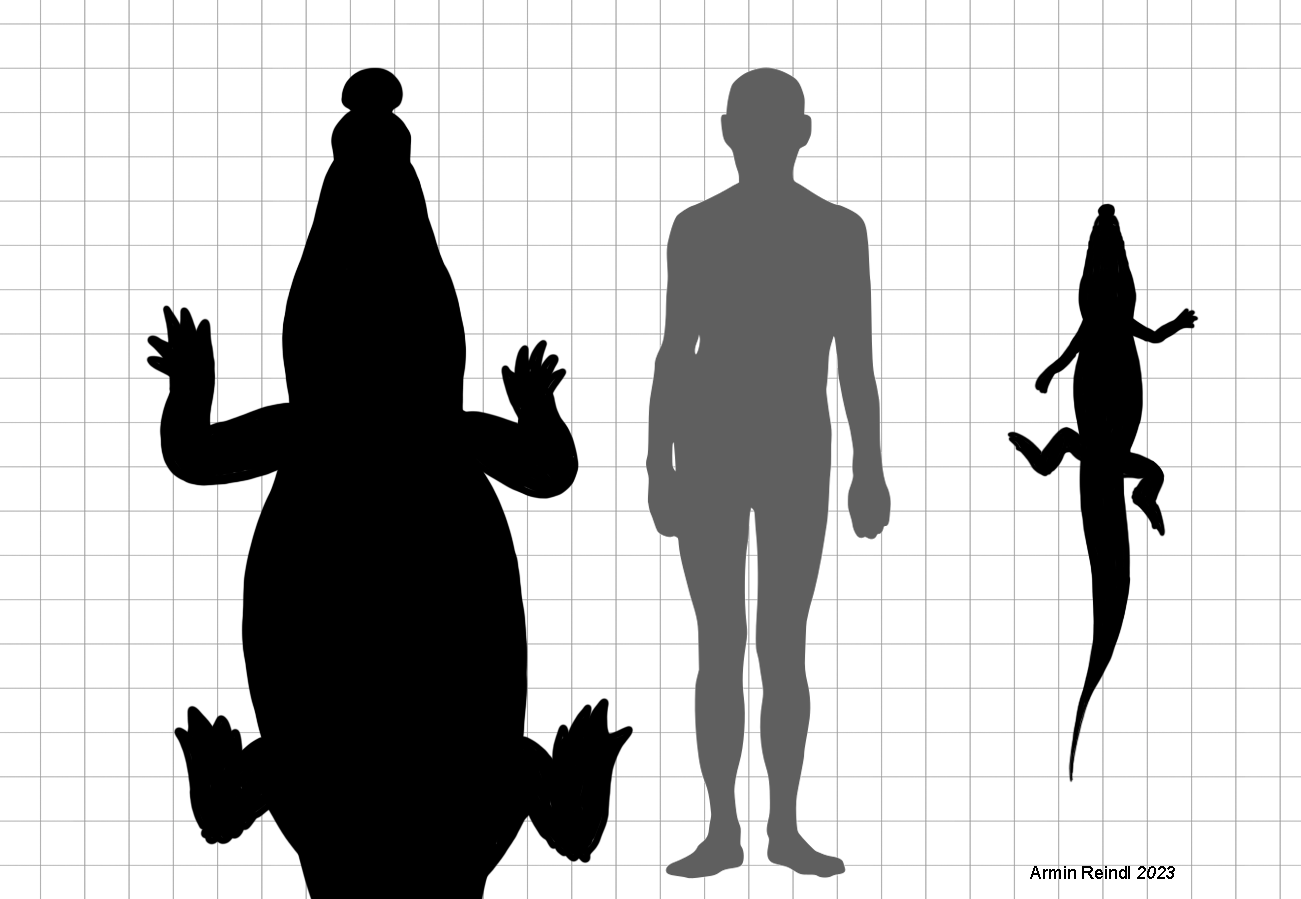
By the Oligocene mekosuchines had evolved both dwarf forms and large-prey specialists.

While the range and diversity of mekosuchines was still relatively restricted during the Eocene, by the Late Oligocene the group had rapidly diversified into a plethora of different morphotypes ranging from semi-aquatic generalists to large prey specialists, dwarf forms and potentially terrestrial predators. The origin of this diversification is unclear due to the absence of mekosuchine fossils in the 30 million year gap between the Late Oligocene forms and the earlier Kambara. However, it is thought that the ancestor of this radiation appeared no later than the middle Eocene. Despite their enormous taxonomic diversity, the range of mekosuchines during this time period was still somewhat limited, with Miocene records primarily stemming from localities in Queensland and the Northern Territory.

Initially, the transition from the Miocene to the Pliocene was regarded as somewhat of a drop in diversity among mekosuchines as it saw the disappearance of both the large macropredatory Baru as well as dwarf forms like Ultrastenos, Trilophosuchus and Mekosuchus. The reasons for this wave of extinction may be tied to widespread changes in climate, with both global cooling and the Middle Miocene climate optimum coming to an end. This may have led to an especially harsh but brief period of aridity that saw a retreat of the Australian rainforests and the destruction of the biomes preferred by Miocene mekosuchine groups. Mekosuchus specifically represents somewhat of an outlier, as it only went extinct on the mainland and continued to survive into the Holocene on various Pacific islands. Subsequently, Ristevski and colleagues point out that future finds might show that these animals could have survived for a little longer on the mainland as well.

While the Miocene-Pliocene transition saw the disappearance of many of the established mekosuchine groups, it did not cause the extinction of the family. Quinkana survived the initial period of aridification as did other mekosuchines, which in turn gave rise to forms like Kalthifrons and Paludirex. Despite the fact that mekosuchines bounced back, they were joined by other groups of crocodilians that made their way to Australia, such as the as of yet unnamed Tirari Desert species of Crocodylus. While it was initially hypothesized that the appearance of Crocodylus in Australia was part of the reason mekosuchines went extinct, there is no actual evidence to suggest a direct link between the two events, with the Tirari Desert taxon likely being entirely unrelated to the crocodiles inhabiting Australia today.

=== Island populations ===
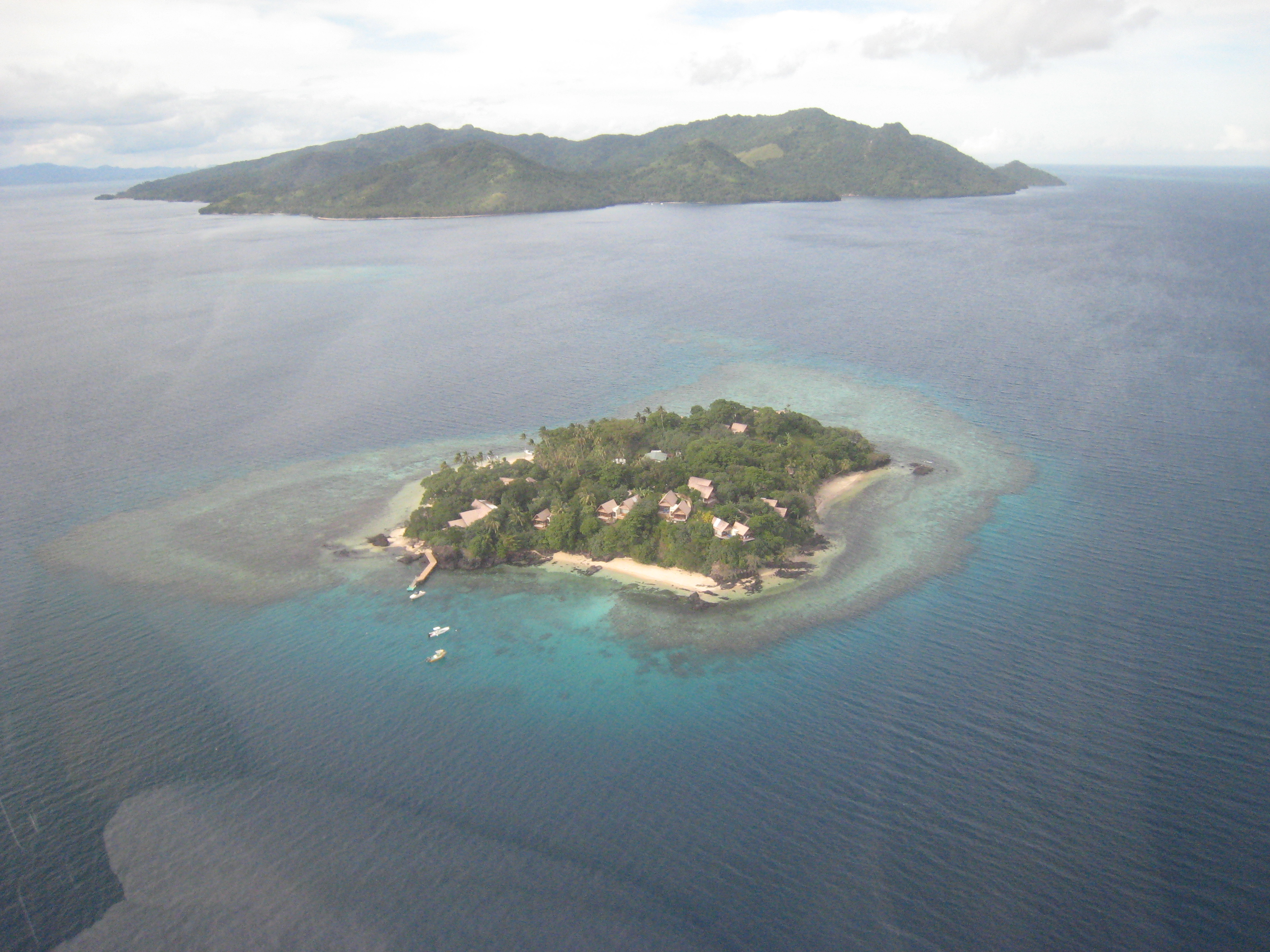
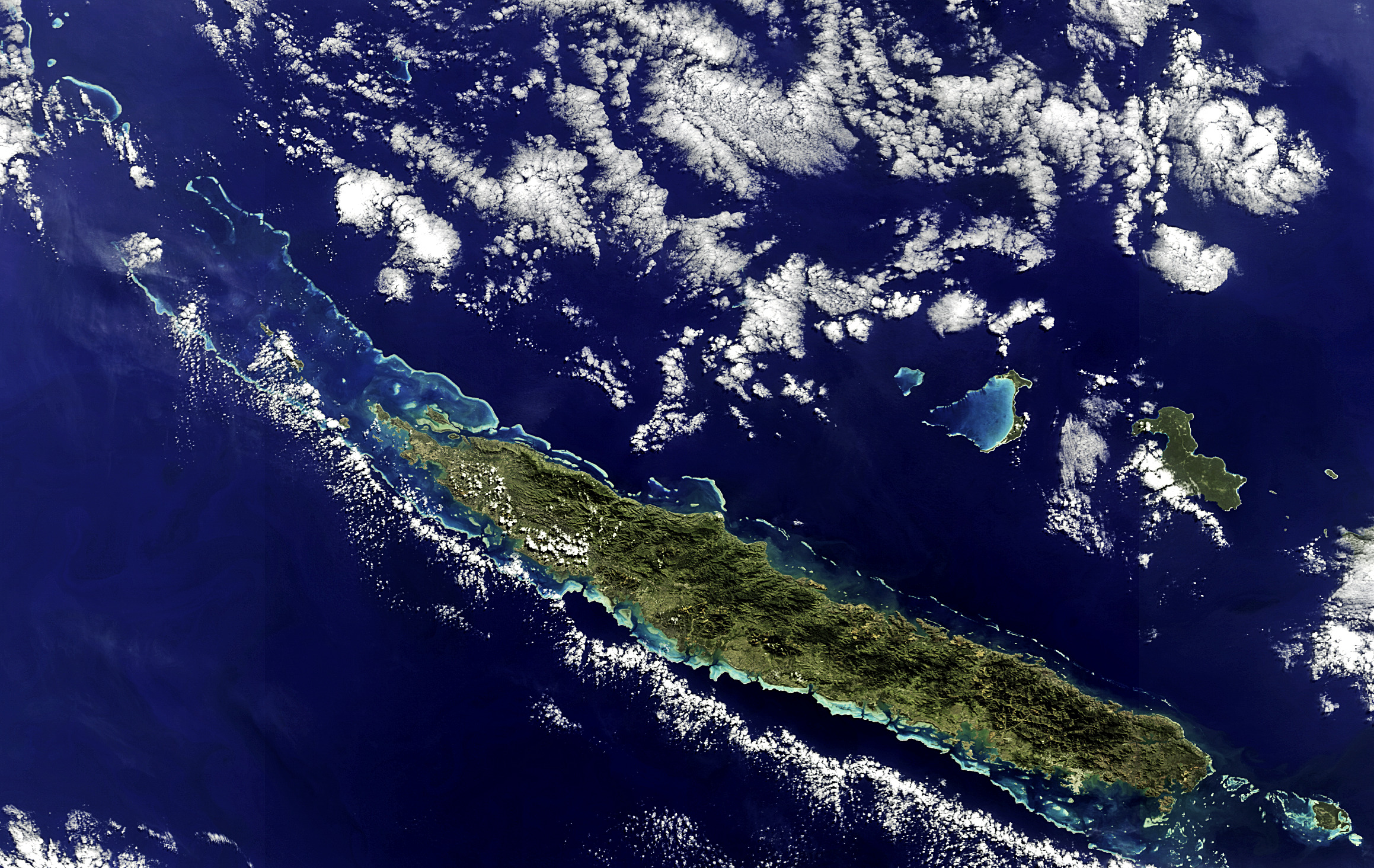
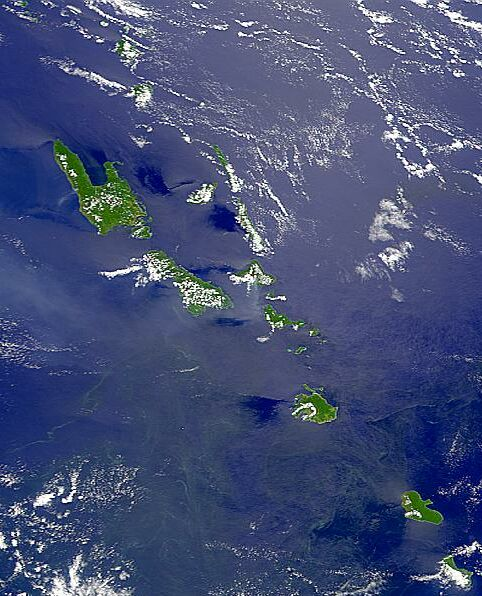
By the Pleistocene mekosuchines had colonized various islands in the South Pacific, namely Fiji, New Caledonia and Vanuatu.

Almost as mysterious as the origins of the group is the presence of mekosuchines on distant Pacific islands during the Pleistocene and Holocene. Although multiple examples are known; Volia from Fiji, Mekosuchus kalpokasi from Vanuatu, and Mekosuchus inexpectatus from New Caledonia; there is no agreement on how these animals got there from mainland Australia. Just like in discussions about the original colonisation of Australia by the clade, the question of osmoregulation and salt tolerance comes into play when speculating on how these distant islands were colonised. Salisbury and colleagues have previously suggested that Mekosuchus might have been more salt tolerant due to the lack of permanent freshwater sources on New Caledonia, however, assuming that the genus was more terrestrial as frequently speculated, the absence of fresh water might have been less crucial.

An alternative hypothesis suggests that mekosuchines arrived on Fiji, Vanuatu and New Caledonia through the act of rafting (being carried there by clinging to drift wood and similar structures) or island hopping. The latter would have especially profited from lower sea levels during this time period, connecting island chains and providing potential stops along the way. While this dispersal could have happened as early as the Oligocene, it is likely that island mekosuchines were a much more recent development.

=== Extinction ===
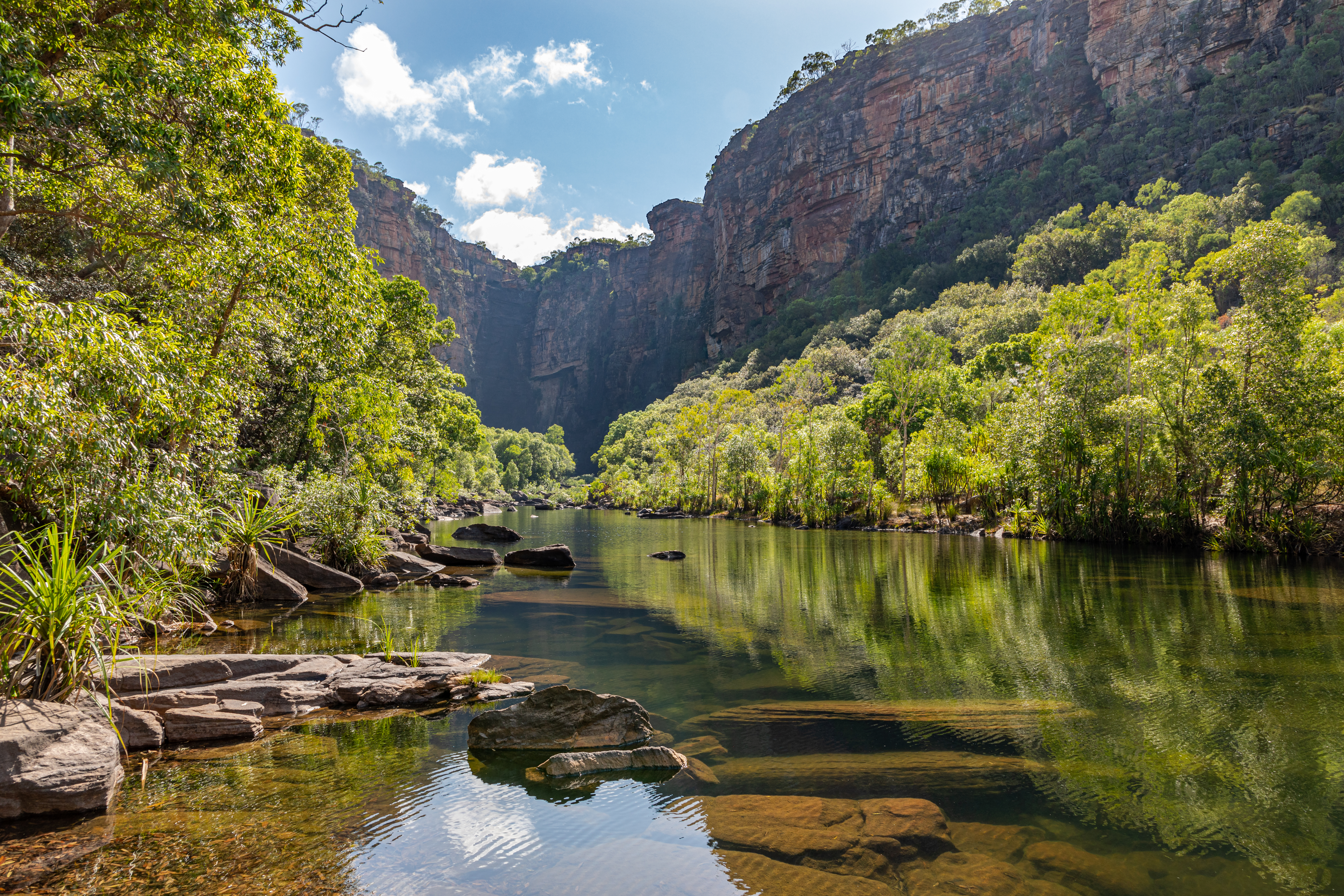
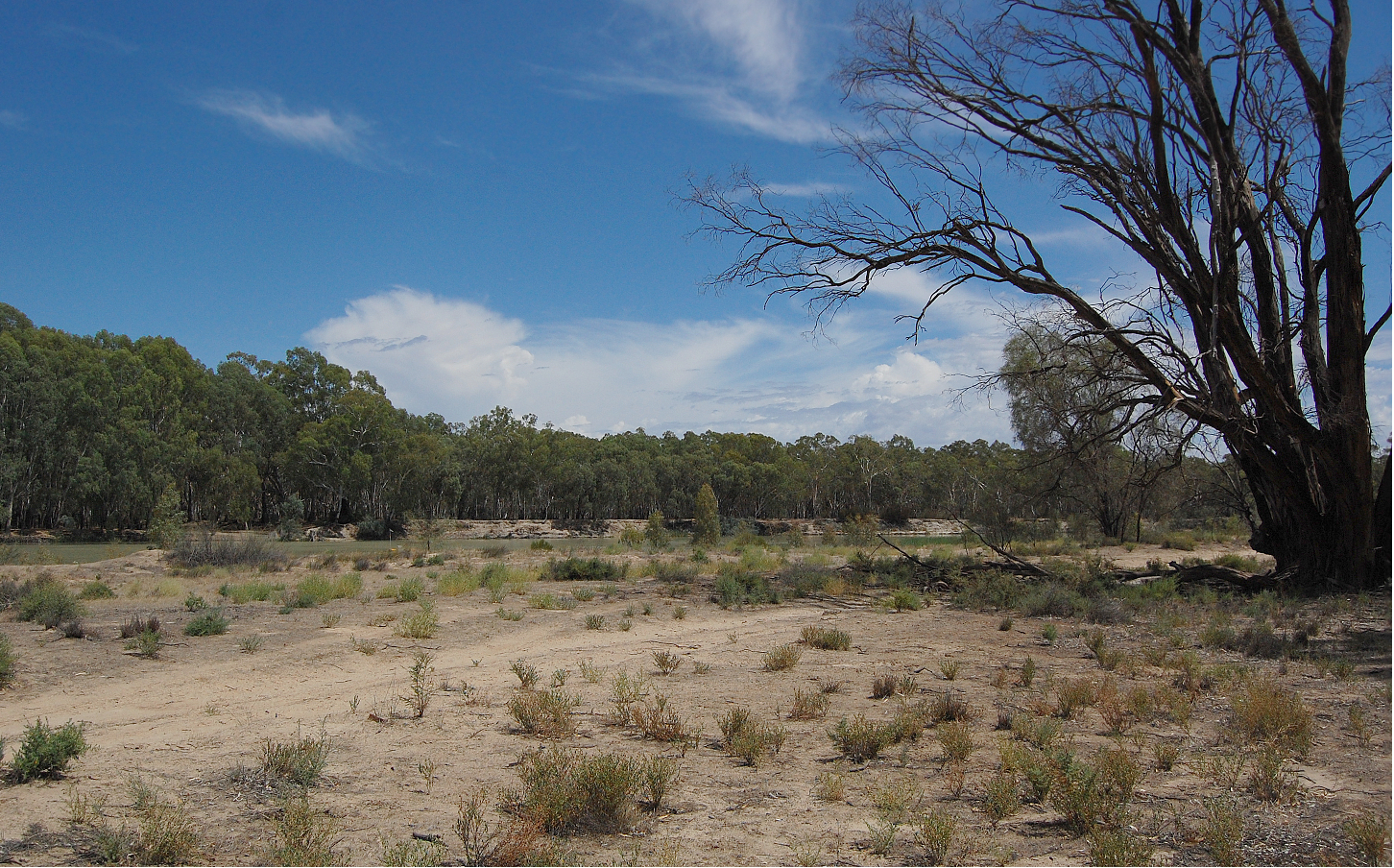
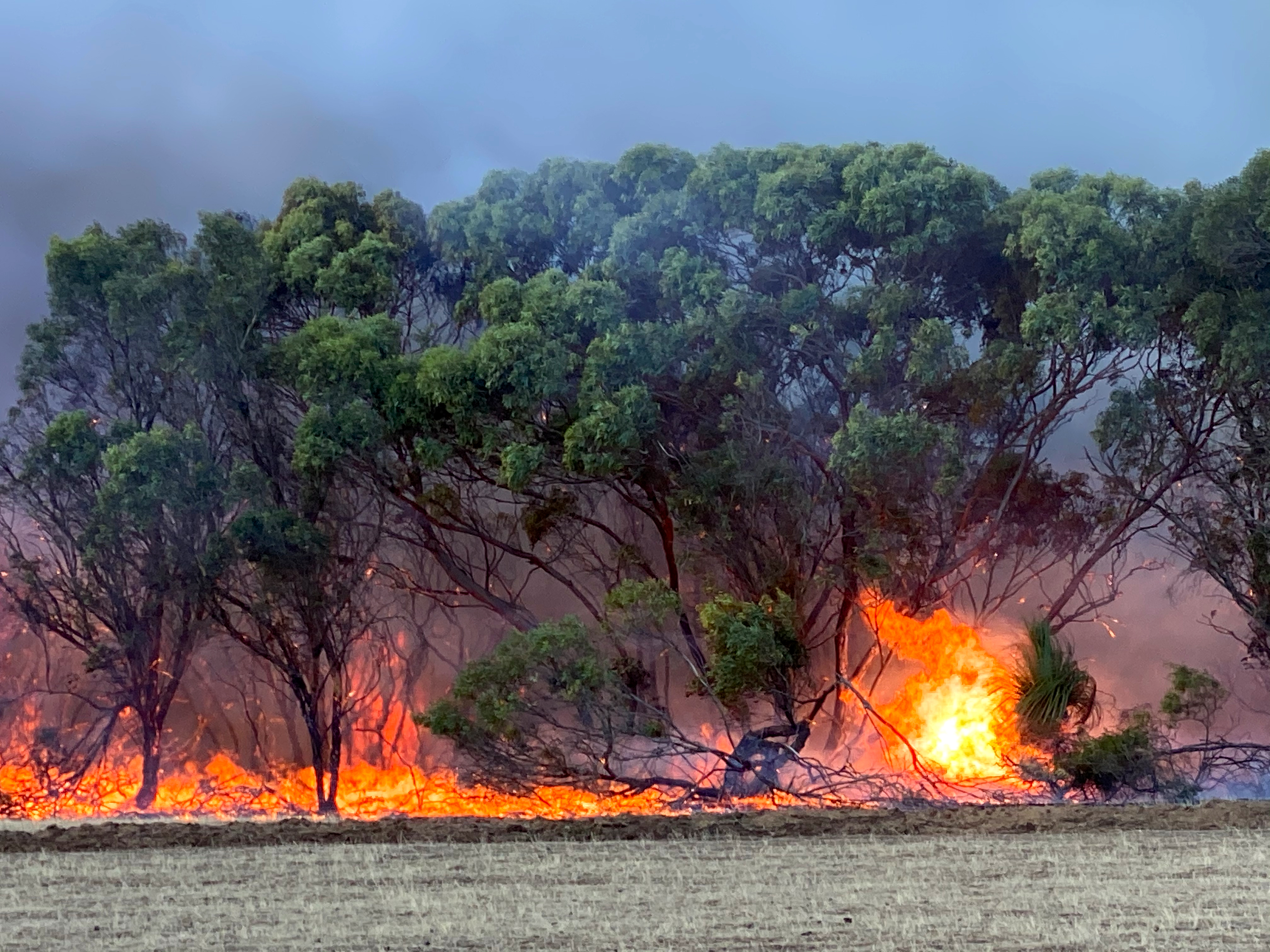
Global climate change saw the preferred habitats of mekosuchines destroyed through droughts and fires.

Despite the fact that mekosuchines initially recovered from the aridification that caused the Miocene-Pliocene faunal turnover, the group continued to suffer from the effects of global cooling and Australia's continuous drift north throughout the Pleistocene. This gradual change in climate was felt across most groups of megafauna that inhabited Australia at the time, with the semiaquatic mekosuchines like Paludirex suffering the most from the disappearance of inland river systems. Hocknull and colleagues write that the Lake Eyre Basin was among the first systems to rapidly deteriorate some 48,000 years ago, followed shortly by other systems in the next eight thousand years. Rainfall fell to levels far below those of today, deriving the systems of their water supply. This did not change until 30,000 years ago, when it was too late for the systems to recover. While it has been speculated that members of the genus Crocodylus could have retreated to coastal waters, surviving due to their osmoregulation, while the more freshwater dependant mekosuchines like Paludirex would have died out as their habitats dried up. This notion has also been supported by Hoffman's 2026 histological study, which argued that the more basal Baru may have been at least somewhat more terrestrialy adapted to switch between bodies of water. If this traveling between habitats was behavior also exhibited by more derived mekosuchines, then this could have rendered them especially susceptible to the aridification of the continent. The team also makes the argument that mekosuchines might have had a greater metabolic demand than modern forms akin to Mesozoic notosuchians, retaining heightened growth rates for longer than their modern relatives, which might have also left them more vulernable to environmental change. Whatever the case, the youngest reliably dated remains of mekosuchines in mainland Australia is a tooth (QMF59869) which dates to at minimum, 20,000 years ago, which belongs to a blunt toothed mekosuchine, possibly Paludirex.

This drying may have also affected more terrestrial forms like Quinkana. Despite its inferred lifestyle, members of the genus are still commonly found in close proximity to freshwater and likely inhabited more forested environments. The aridification of Australia led to the collapse of the continents rainforest systems approximately 50,000 years ago and by 44,000 years ago fires had begun to crop up more frequently than before. Even before these events, authors note a shift from vine scrubland to more open environments during the Late Pliocene and Early Pleistocene, coinciding with a decrease in known Quinkana material.

In both the instances listed above, human involvement appears to not have been a factor, with Hocknull and colleagues arguing that the two events simply coincided, citing the fact that the megafaunal extinctions on the Australian mainland seemingly ran in the opposite direction of what would be suspected if humans were the driving cause. Ristevski and colleagues further highlight that some of the youngest remains of Quinkana may suggest that humans and mekosuchines overlapped for some 40,000 years, going against the idea that mekosuchines were wiped out rapidly by newly arriving humans. The team further highlights that interactions between humans and continental crocodilians are not recorded in the fossil record until the Holocene, after mekosuchines had gone extinct. They nevertheless do not rule out a human factor in their disappearance entirely, citing various secondary effects they might have had on the environment that may have been contributing factors, such as cultural burning.

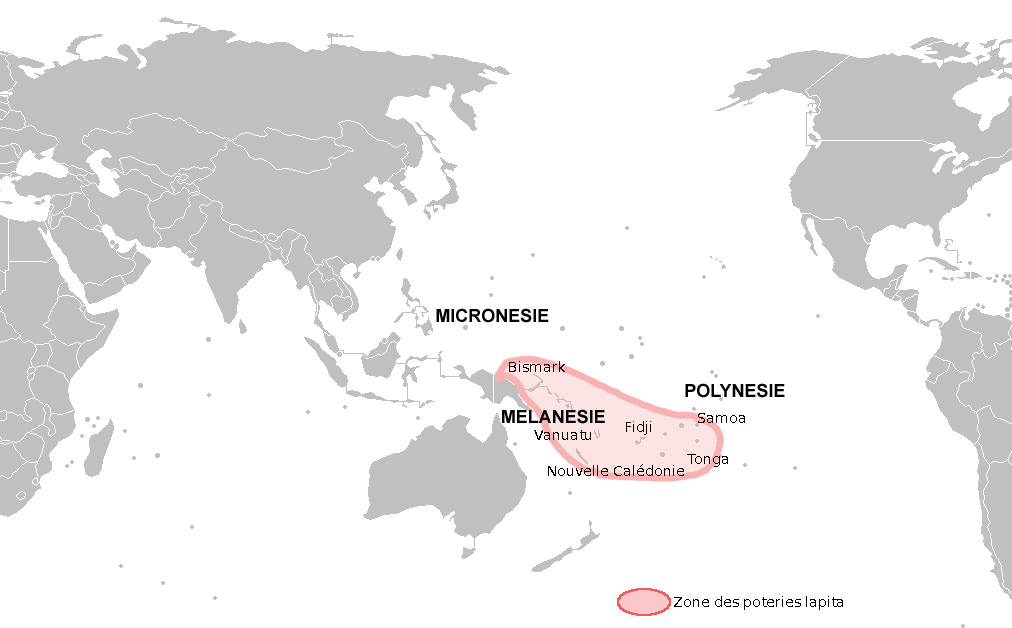
The Lapita people inhabited large parts of Melanesia and Polynesia, including islands that were home to the last mekosuchines.

While mainland mekosuchines died out during the Pleistocene, isolated insular taxa continued to survive, possibly even into the Holocene. The extinction of Mekosuchus is frequently linked to the arrival of the Lapita people in the South Pacific, supported by the fact that the range of the genus overlapped with human settlements and by the association of M. kalpokasi remains with human tools at the Arapus archaeological site on Efate. Factors contributing to the disappearance of island mekosuchines range from direct hunting of the crocodiles to habitat destruction and the introduction of invasive species like pigs and rats. However, this idea is not entirely uncontested, as Anderson and colleagues point out that most remains of M. inexpectatus appear to have been deposited prior to human arrival. They further highlight that no direct evidence for crocodile-human interactions (like butchery marks) exist. On the other hand, M. kalpokasi fossils found at archaeological sites do bear the gnaw marks of rats and fossils tentatively referred to Volia were found as oven contents. The last mekosuchines likely died out approximately 3,000 years ago, with some disputed material suggesting that Mekosuchus might have even lived until as recently as 1,720 years ago.

== Paleobiology ==
=== Terrestriality ===
Although most mekosuchines exhibit hallmark traits of being semi-aquatic animals, possessing flattened skulls with nares and eyes directed more upward, there are some genera which might suggest that a more land-based lifestyle arose in some branches of the family.

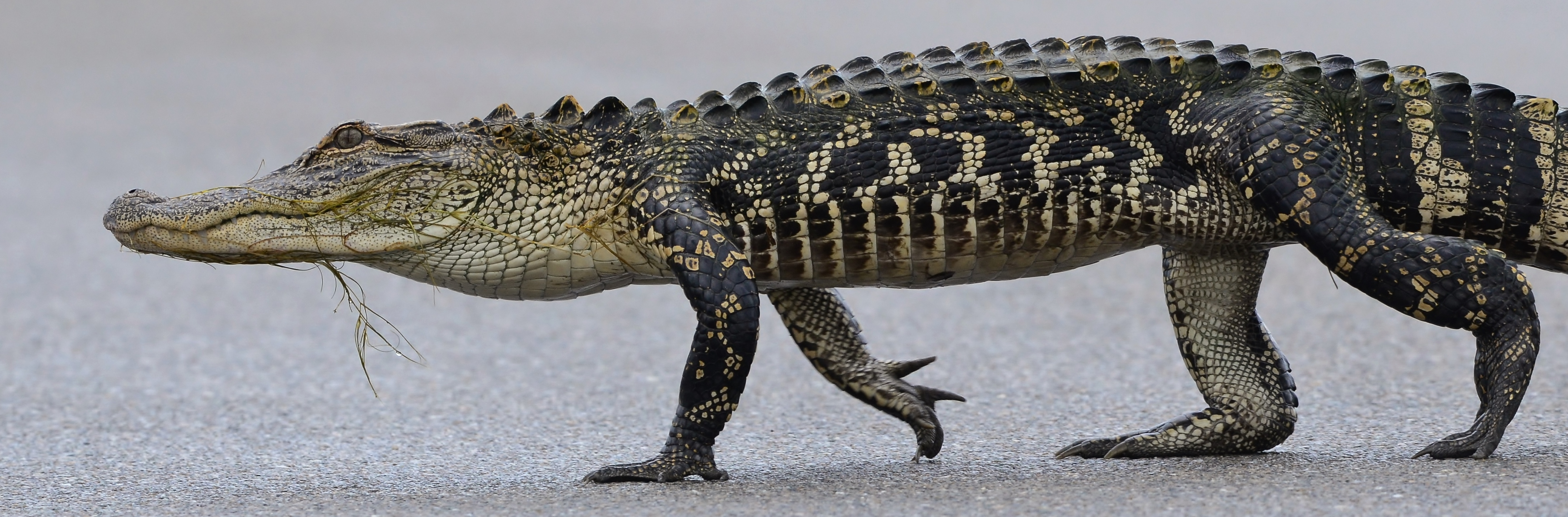
Though still semi-aquatic, Kambara might have been better adapted at performing the high walk, shown here on an American Alligator.

The earliest hints at these derived terrestrial mekosuchines can actually be found in the oldest known member of the family: Kambara. Despite being widely recognized as semi-aquatic with a classically crocodilian head suited for such life, Kambara also featured certain peculiar adaptations to its limbs that could have facilitated much easier travel across land relative to modern crocodiles. Study of the humerus has shown that the upper forelimbs could have been swung with much greater force and would have provided greater stability when walking, helping the animal keep its torso off the ground while performing the so-called high walk. At the same time, these adaptations would have positively affected both stride length and walking speed as well. The range of motion of the forelimbs was likewise greater than what is seen in the true crocodiles that inhabit Australia today.

A later study focused on mekosuchines in general; examining material assigned to Kambara, Baru, the "Floraville Taxon" and what might have either been a juvenile Baru or Mekosuchus; suggests that the group as a whole had columnar humeri than modern crocodylids with an elliptical rather than rounded cross-section. These factors significantly affect the stress the bones are put under when the animals lift their bodies of the ground, either for a sprawling gait or for the highwalk. The study suggests that the curved humeri of modern crocs serve to provide a more constant core of neutral stress regardless of what gait is assumed by them and provide greater safety when sprawling. Mekosuchines meanwhile appear to have had a lower baseline stress that does not spike as much when switching from one gait to the other, effectively making the highwalk much more viable. The anatomy also seems to support the idea that mekosuchines would have been able to perform the highwalk even after reaching a certain size, while many modern crocodiles cease to move this way after growing too large.

All these adaptations, while advantageous for walking on land, do not necessarily show that mekosuchines as a whole were terrestrial, rather they show that they were better adapted to walk on land while not negating any of the adaptations for aquatic life. This is somewhat highlighted by the anatomy of the shoulder girdle and hips, which although favouring terrestrial habits in one instance, generally appear very close to those of modern crocodilians. In the case of Kambara specifically, the hips represent the plesiomorphic condition and greatly resemble those of gharials and alligators, with later mekosuchines seemingly either diverging into more terrestrial forms or converging with modern crocodiles. Regarding the limbs of Kambara, the same adaptations useful for movement on land also bring advantages for swimming. Lucas A. Buchanan, who described Kambara taraina, notes in his PhD thesis that the animal does not show any other notable adaptations for terrestrial life and sticks close to the anatomy of modern salt- and freshwater crocodiles in many aspects. The notion that Kambara could have possessed a fibular condyle and thus had more hinge-like movement of the knee is entertained, but could not be confirmed due to the preservation of the fossil material. A final clue against overly terrestrial habits in Kambara is the fact that most individuals are known from a mass death site that preserves the results of a lake drying out, killing the crocodilians that previously inhabited it.

Another addition to the debate came with a 2026 histological study conducted based on limb material of Kambara and Baru. The study broadly found that the medulary cavity of the studied mekosuchines tended to be proportionally larger than in modern crocodilians, which have limb bones with a greater ratio of cortical bone serving as buoyancy control. The study did however ultimately find that the ratio seen in Kambara was still relatively similar to extant semi-aquatic forms. More extreme meanwhile was the result recovered from the bones of Baru, Baru darrowi in particular, in which the ratio approaches what is seen in the Triassic genus Terrestrisuchus. However, while the team interprets it as evidence for some degree of terrestrialisation, they do note that the results are not beyond doubt and may be subject to a number of factors. They further reiterate that Baru shows a number of semiaquatic adaptations in its skull, suggesting that perhaps the altered internal structure of the long bones helped the animals move between bodies of water rather than support a terrestrial lifestyle.

More commonly regarded as terrestrial, albeit not uncontested, are species of the genera Trilophosuchus, Mekosuchus and Quinkana, each of them supported by multiple lines of reasoning. One key aspect in favour of terrestrial habits is the skull shape. Unlike most other mekosuchines including Kambara, all three of these taxa had altirostral skulls, meaning the head was comparably boxy and deep rather than flattened.

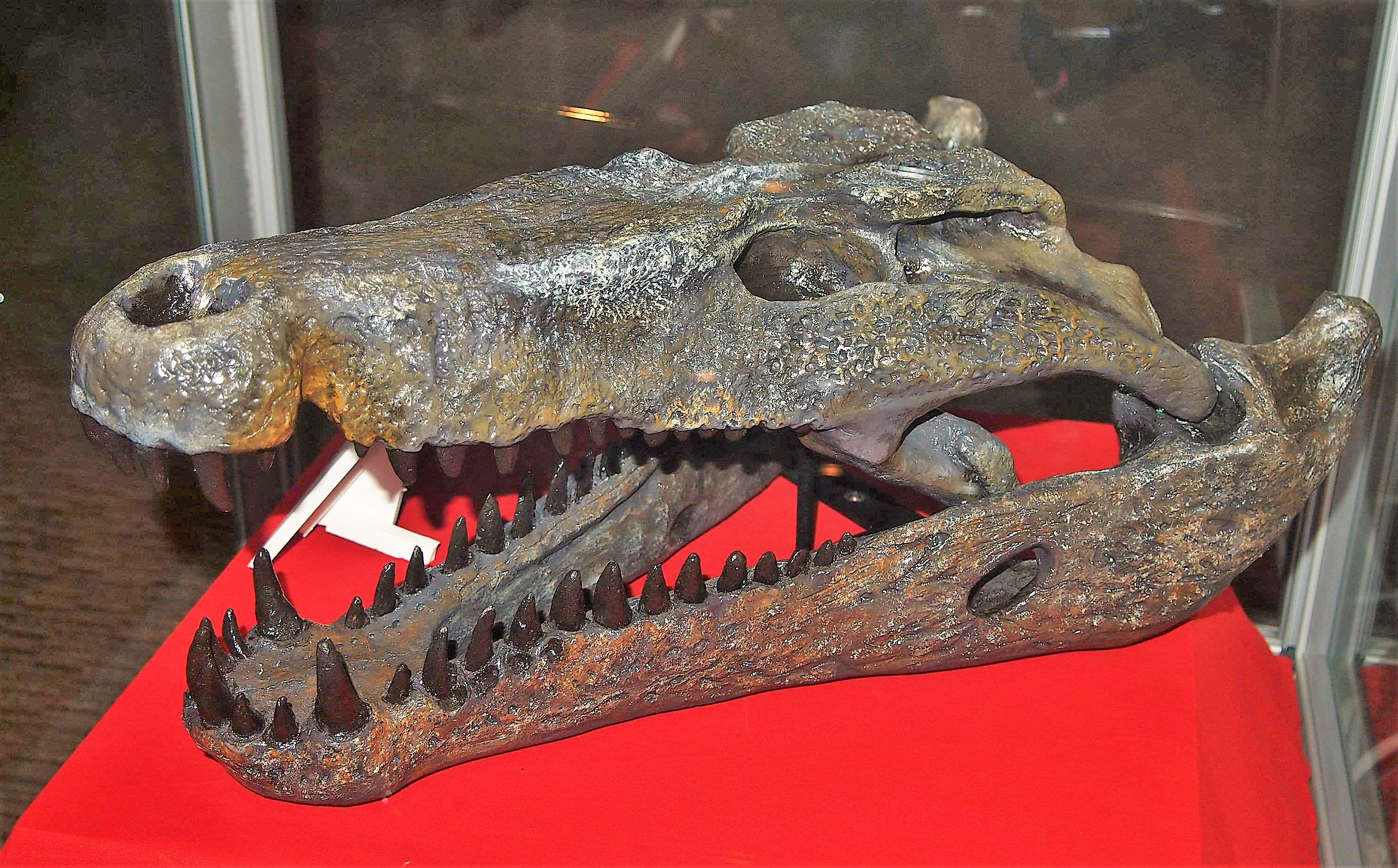
Some mekosuchines like Quinkana might have spent a significant amount of time on land.

In Mekosuchus the eyes are large and directed towards the side of the skull while the nostrils open more towards the front, whereas both open more towards the top of the skull in semi-aquatic crocodiles, allowing them to see above the water's surface even if otherwise submerged. Habitat has also been a factor, with the island of New Caledonia, where M. inexpectatus lived, lacking in large bodies of freshwater, while Balouet and Buffetaut further point to the well developed muscular insertions. Trilophosuchus has a similar skull to Mekosuchus, though the position of the nares is unknown. Study of muscle attachment sites have suggested that Trilophosuchus held its head much higher than typical for crocodilians, more akin to what is seen in agamid lizards or basking caimans today. Historically, Trilophosuchus has been compared to both protosuchids and notosuchians, two famously terrestrial groups of Mesozoic crocodylomorphs. Scans of the brain also seem to give clues towards terrestrial life, with brain pneumaticity in particular seemingly correlating with the animals lifestyle. According to Ristevski and colleagues, Trilophosuchus displays a blend of features of crocodylians and more basal groups. The overall shape of the endocast resembles Araripesuchus and the ratios between the inner ear elements bears resemblance to baurusuchids and sphenosuchians. The highly pneumatized skull is compared favorably to notosuchians and, notably, modern dwarf caimans and dwarf crocodiles of the general Paleosuchus and Osteolaemus. This comparison was not novel and had previously been proposed by Holt in 2007, who suggested that Mekosuchus may have inhabited small rainforest streams and came out during the night to hunt near the waters edge or on land.

More unconventional is the hypothesis that Mekosuchus specifically was an arboreal animal, however this idea, first introduced by Willis in 1997, was later argued against by Scanlon and is entirely absent in recent literature including the 2023 work by Jorgo Ristevski (which Willis participated in).

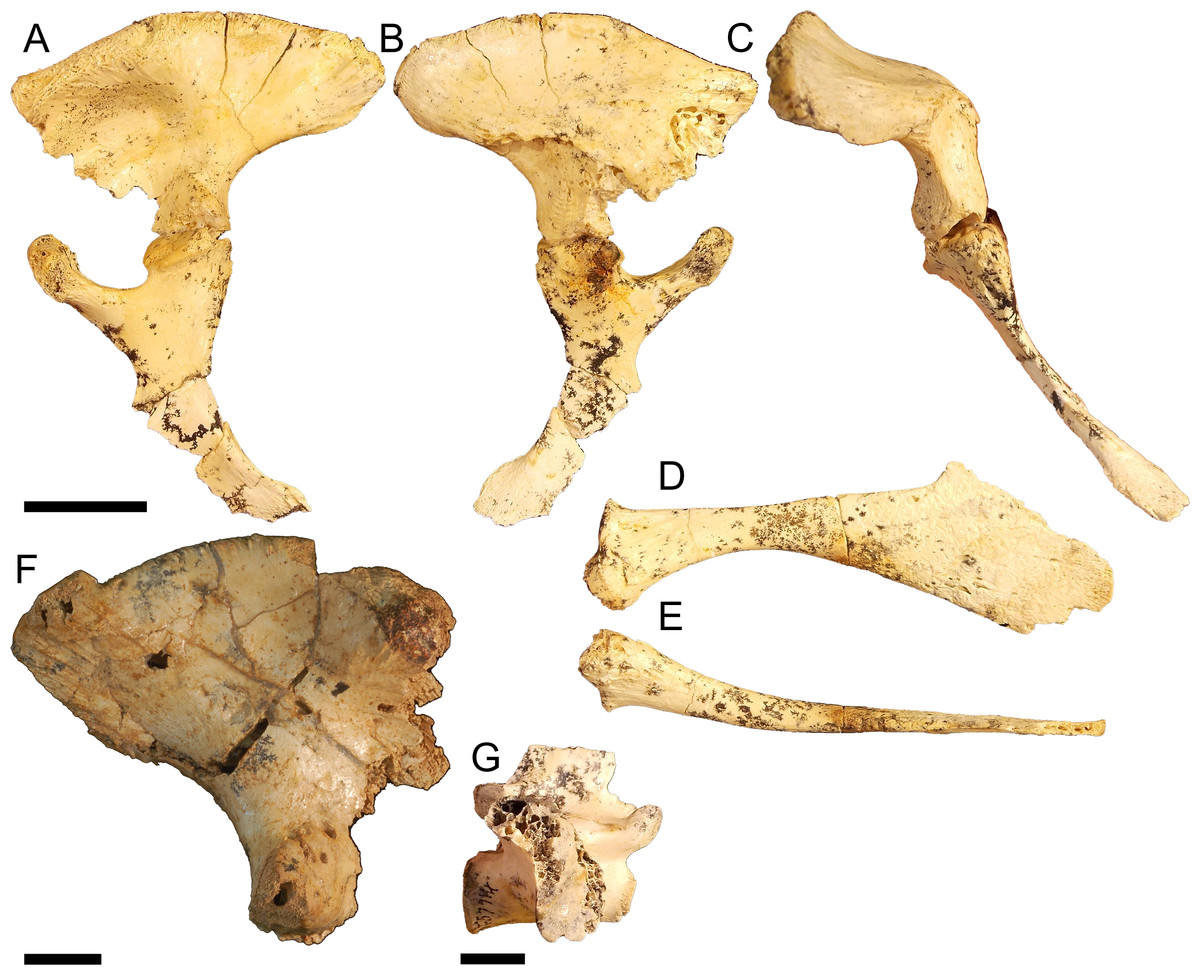
Pelvic form four, a fossil that seemingly confirms the presence of terrestrial mekosuchines in the Riversleigh.

Much like with Mekosuchus, the idea that Quinkana was terrestrial is primarily based on the outward appearance of the skull, which is deep and houses rows of ziphodont teeth (meaning they were blade-lake compressed with prominent serrations along the cutting edge). This anatomy drew immediate comparison to sebecids and planocraniids, two much better understood groups of Cretaceous to Paleogene crocodylomorphs famous for their terrestrial lifestyles. Though the precise use of ziphodont teeth is unclear, several authors have come forward to propose that they may be linked to taking terrestrial prey, chasing prey on land or more broadly that Quinkana filled a nische similar to modern Komodo dragons. A key issue with the inferred terrestrial habits of Quinkana is the lack of postcranial material that would be crucial in confirming or debunking these ideas. In the case of planocraniids, the presence of a rounded tail cross-section (rather than laterally flattened) and hoof-like toes both clearly point to terrestrial habits, but no such material is confidently assigned to Quinkana. The closest to Quinkana postcrania to be found consists of some pelvic remains described as "pelvic form four" by Stein and colleagues in 2017. This pelvis from the Riversleigh WHA is tentatively assigned to Quinkana meboldi primarily due to its specialized anatomy. Unlike the other pelvic forms discussed by Stein and colleagues (like those of Kambara and Baru), pelvic form four indicates that the animal it belonged to had a pillar-erect stance and only a limited sprawling gait, similar to what is observed in sebecosuchians. However, while this interpretation would be a dead ringer for the habits inferred for Quinkana based on its skull, the lack of overlapping material means that the material cannot be confidently assigned to the genus until a skull is actually found in association with postcranial material.

The primary argument against a terrestrial lifestyle for Quinkana stems from a 2002 publication by Stephen Wroe. In this work, Wroe first argues against a prior argument by Molnar and Willis that reptiles were the top predators of Australia, highlighting the relative rarity of Megalania and Quinkana remains to those of marsupials. Wroe further argues that Quinkana would have been highly dependent on water for protection, mating or thermoregulation and claims that the hoof-like toes of planocraniids were an artifact of preservation. While the former point could still be applicable, the latter was eventually combated by Christopher Brochu, who confirmed the authenticity of that morphology. Naturally, Wroe's arguments do not fully account for Stein's "pelvic form four", described 15 years later.

Overall, current consensus leans towards Quinkana having had more terrestrial habits, though postcranial material would be needed to fully confirm the hypothesis. Most researchers acknowledge the limited information that can be gathered from skull material alone.

=== Ecology ===
Across their existence mekosuchines filled a plethora of different niches in the freshwater ecosystems of Australia, evolving different skull shapes to exploit various food sources and minimize competition. This would have been especially valuable in environments such as the Oligocene and Miocene Riversleigh, where multiple different mekosuchines all inhabited the same areas at the same time.

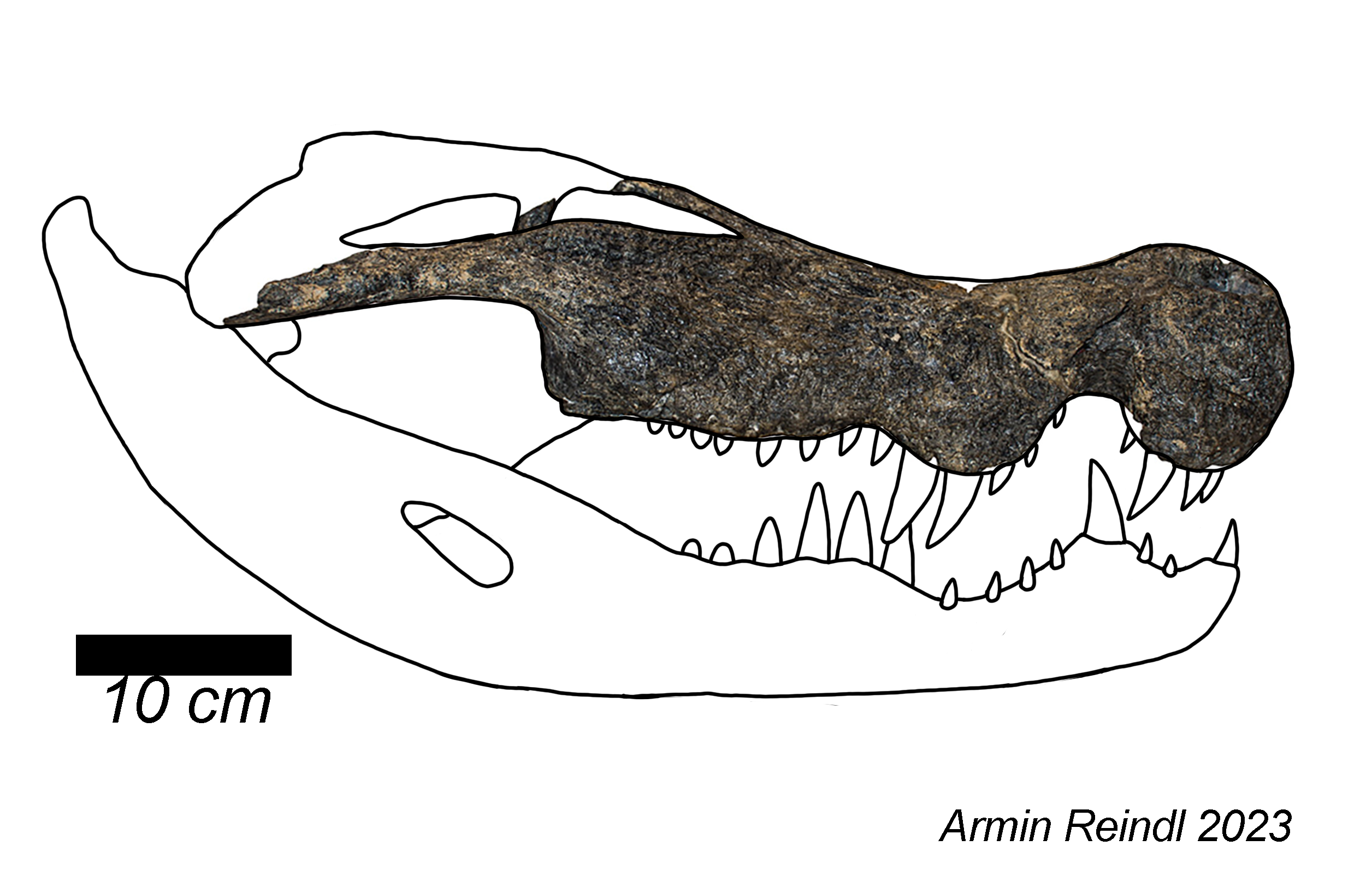
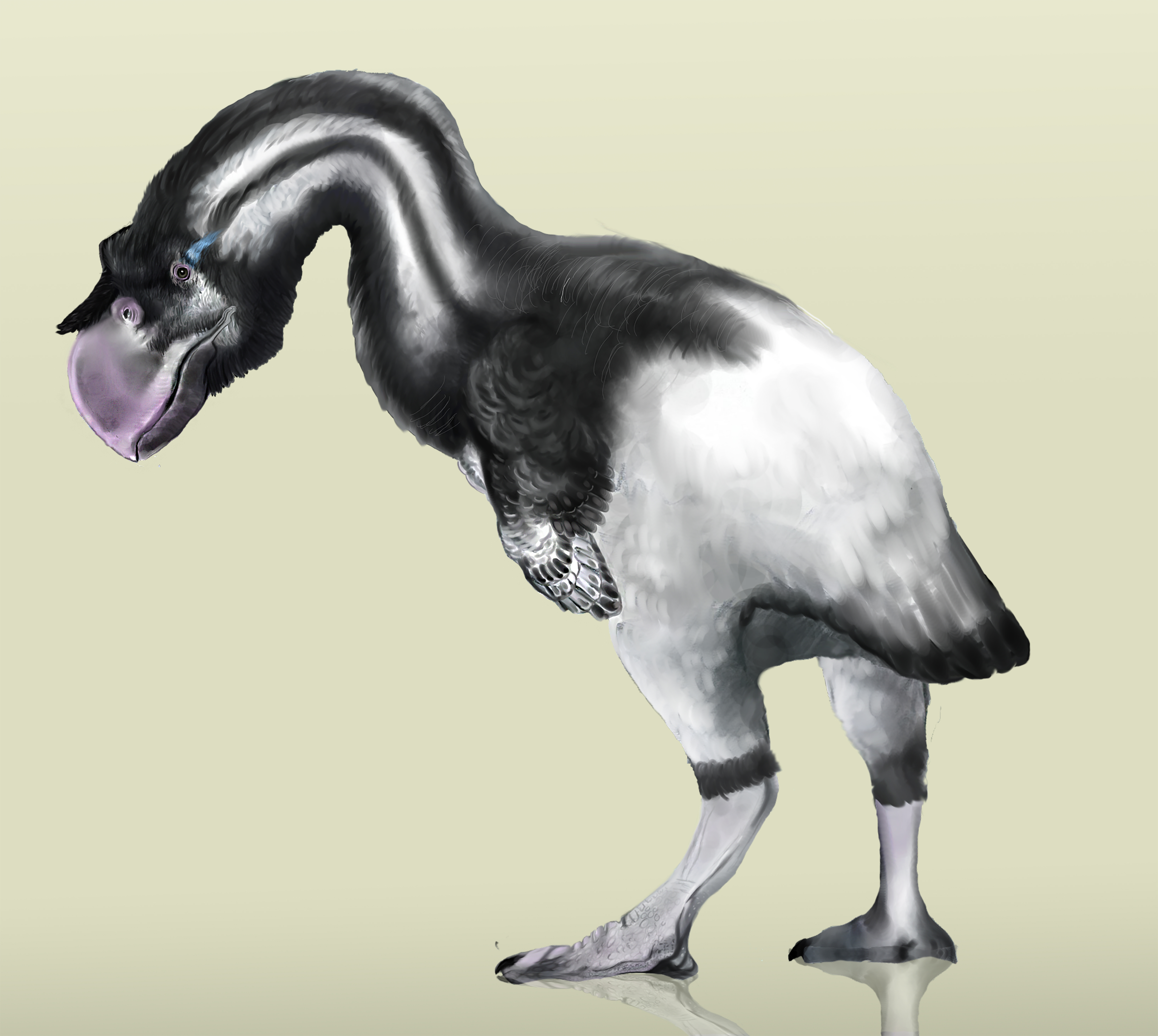
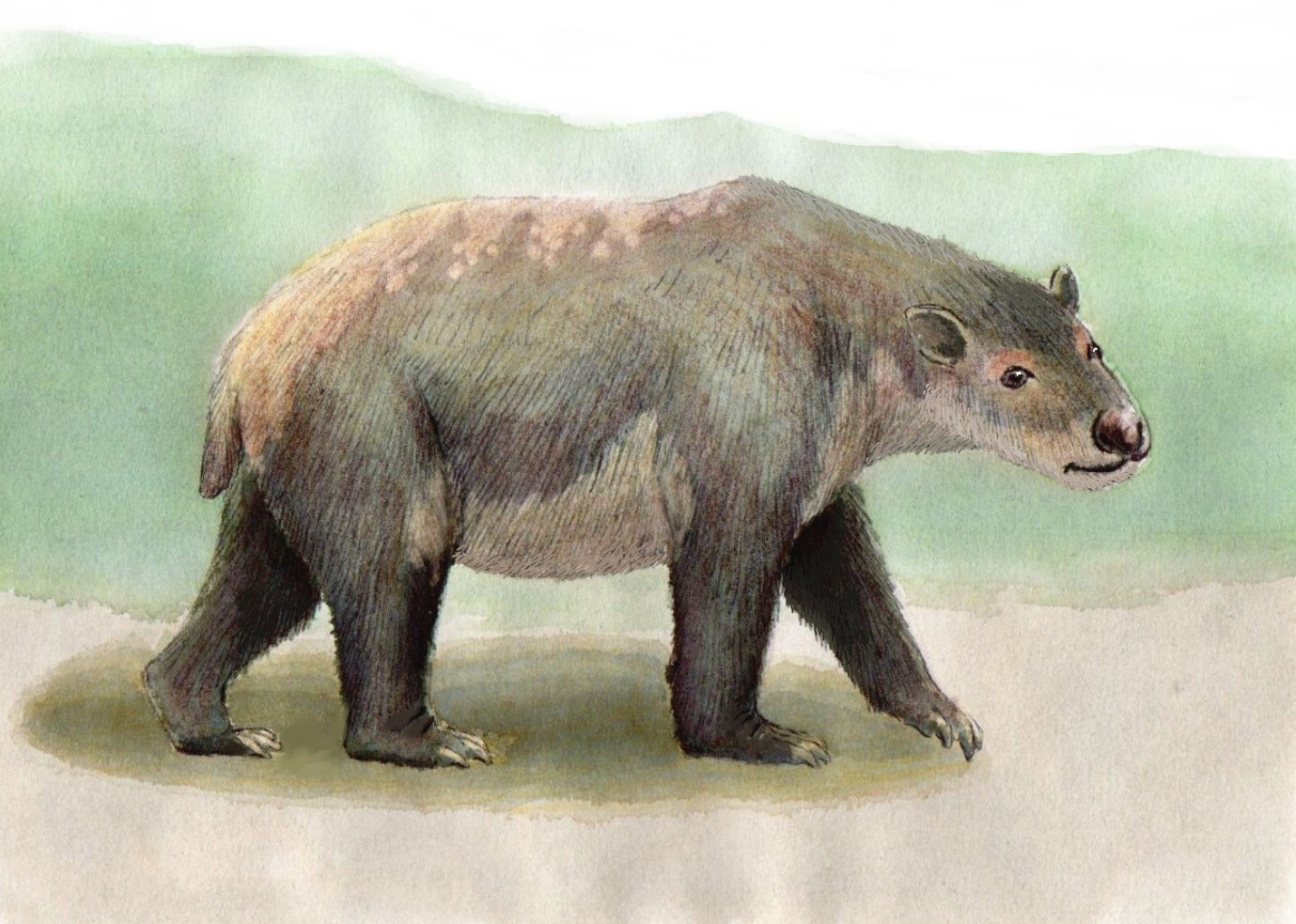
Fossil evidence shows that Baru preyed on both flightless birds and large marsupials.

Some mekosuchines, most prominently Kambara and Australosuchus, possessed platyrostral mesorostrine skulls, meaning their heads were flattened and neither especially elongated nor shortened. This morphology, also seen in many modern crocodilians, is generally suited for a more generalist lifestyle, with these animals generally being thought to feed on a wide variety of prey items. Kambara is among the better studied of the two, with researchers having proposed that the differing types of tooth occlusions seen between species of this genus correlate to slightly altered prey preferences. Lucas A. Buchanan suggests that among the four Kambara species, those with interlocking teeth (K. implexidens and K. taraina) might be better adapted to grasp and restrain large struggling prey whereas the overbite seen in K. murgonensis could be employed to cut and slice. Buchanan further notes that among the species with interlocking dentition, K. taraina had an exceptionally well developed retroarticular process, corresponding to strong pterygoid muscles and thus a stronger bite. Additionally, the musculature used in holding and crushing were also well developed, leading to the hypothesis that Kambara taraina was especially well suited to tackle larger prey than its relatives. Despite this, little direct evidence of Kambara feeding habits exists, the one exception being a turtle shell bearing the distinct tooth marks of a crocodile found in the same sediments as the remains of Kambara. The patterns left on the turtle's carapace suggest that Kambara engaged in behavior known as juggling, the act of repeatedly biting prey in a fashion that would align it with the teeth in the back of the jaw, allowing the animal to break through the robust shell. In the case of this particular fossil, the turtle appears to have survived the initial encounter only to die of an infection later.

This general bauplan is taken a step further by the large Paludirex, which also features a broad and flattened skull, although one that is notably more robust than those of Australosuchus and Kambara. Given that fact and the shere size of the larger of the two species, P. vincenti, it has been proposed that this genus was specialised in taking larger prey items than its relatives.

Another genus of mekosuchine specialised in taking larger prey is Baru, although its anatomy is strikingly different. Unlike the flattened skulls of Paludirex, Kambara and Australosuchus, the skull of Baru is described as deep (altirostral) and cleaver-like with long teeth bearing fine crenulations. These robust jaws, slicing teeth and the pronounced festooning might have aided Baru in tackling large prey items and dispatching it quickly by inflicting massive amounts of trauma. This hunting method contrasts strongly with the more typical approach of grabbing and drowning, possibly indicating a preference for shallower waters that would render the latter tactic less effective and more risky. Willis and colleagues speculate that Baru may have been able to tackle prey up to 300 kg (660 lb) in weight and fossil evidence suggests that Baru fed on marsupials like Neohelos and flightless birds like Emuarius and Bullockornis.

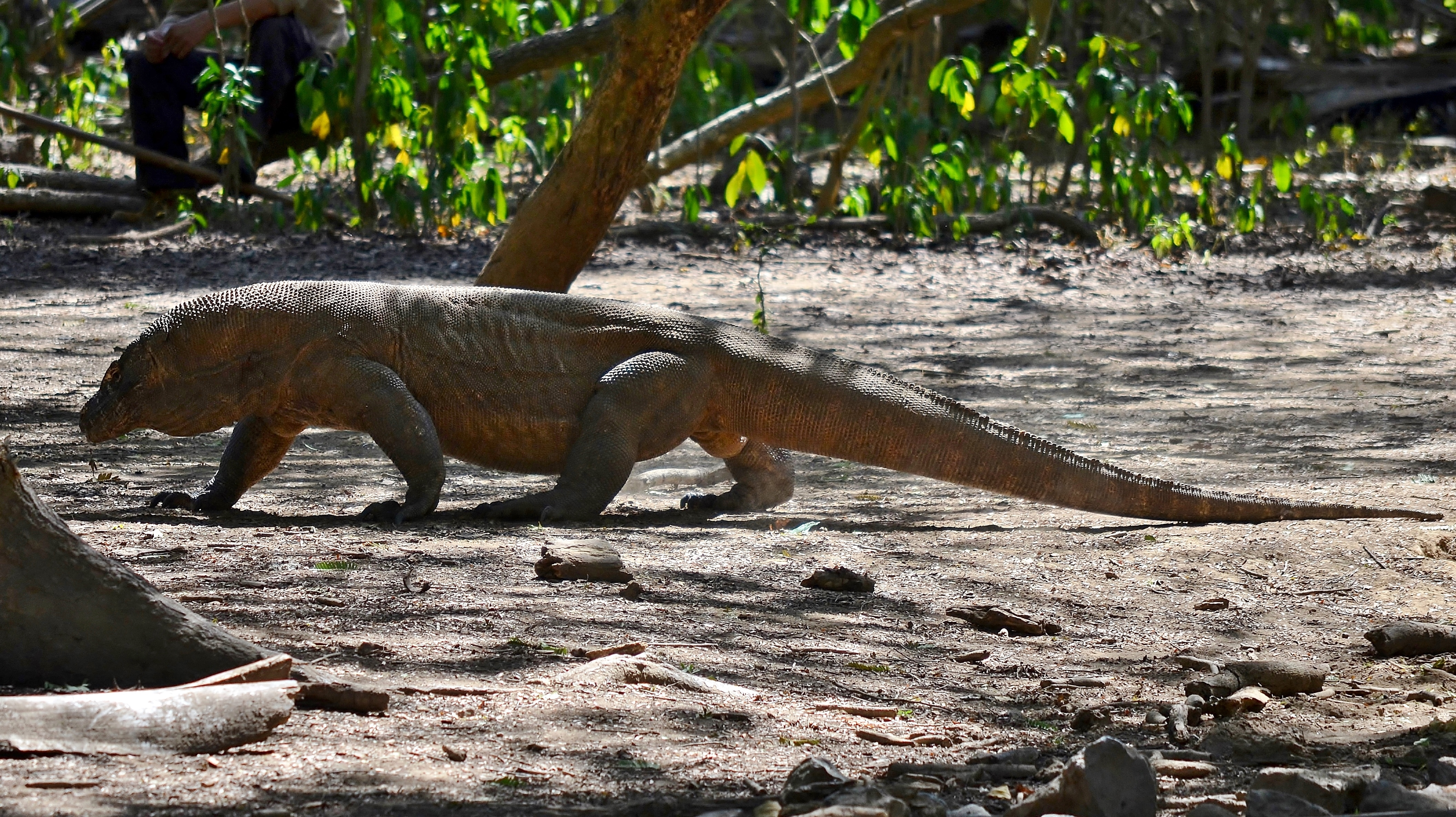
Quinkana may have hunted in a manner similar to Komodo dragons.

Some of the most specialised anatomy can be seen in Quinkana, suggesting that the genus had a lifestyle drastically different from other mekosuchines. The teeth of Quinkana are ziphodont, resembling those of terrestrial sebecosuchians, planocraniids and monitor lizards, although their precise function is unclear. Molnar has argued that ziphodont dentition indicates an ability to tackle larger prey, terrestrial prey or possibly other crocodilians. Busbey and Willis both draw comparison to modern komodo dragons while Stein and colleagues suggest that ziphodont dentition might be tied to cursorial hunting habits, chasing after prey rather than ambushing it. Murray and Vickers-Rich take a similar approach, but conclude that Quinkana could have still ambushed prey on land, possibly by lying in wait near game trails.

Possibly the most enigmatic mekosuchines in terms of ecology are the dwarf taxa Trilophosuchus and Mekosuchus. In the case of Trilophosuchus, the study of muscle attachments seems to indicate that rapid sideways movement of the head did play a part in its feeding method, but also showcases that it did not have to face the same resistances as semi-aquatic crocodilians, causing the muscles to be somewhat weaker. Similarly, Mekosuchus whitehunterensis' musculature has been in interpreted as an adaptation to rip flesh from carcasses, either through the same sideways movements as inferred for Trilophosuchus or by using the traditional crocodilian death roll, although it would have been notably less effective due to the small size of the animal. This would match the fact that shaking seems to be favored by small and juvenile individuals of modern crocodiles. This is further supported by specific adaptations to the muscle attachments in M. whitehunterensis and the simple fact that the inferred terrestrial habits of the animal would render a death roll much more dangerous if performed on land relative to in the water. Pulling and lifting might have also been a strategy employed by this animal, whether that be to strip the kills of other predators or to dismember its own kills is unclear.

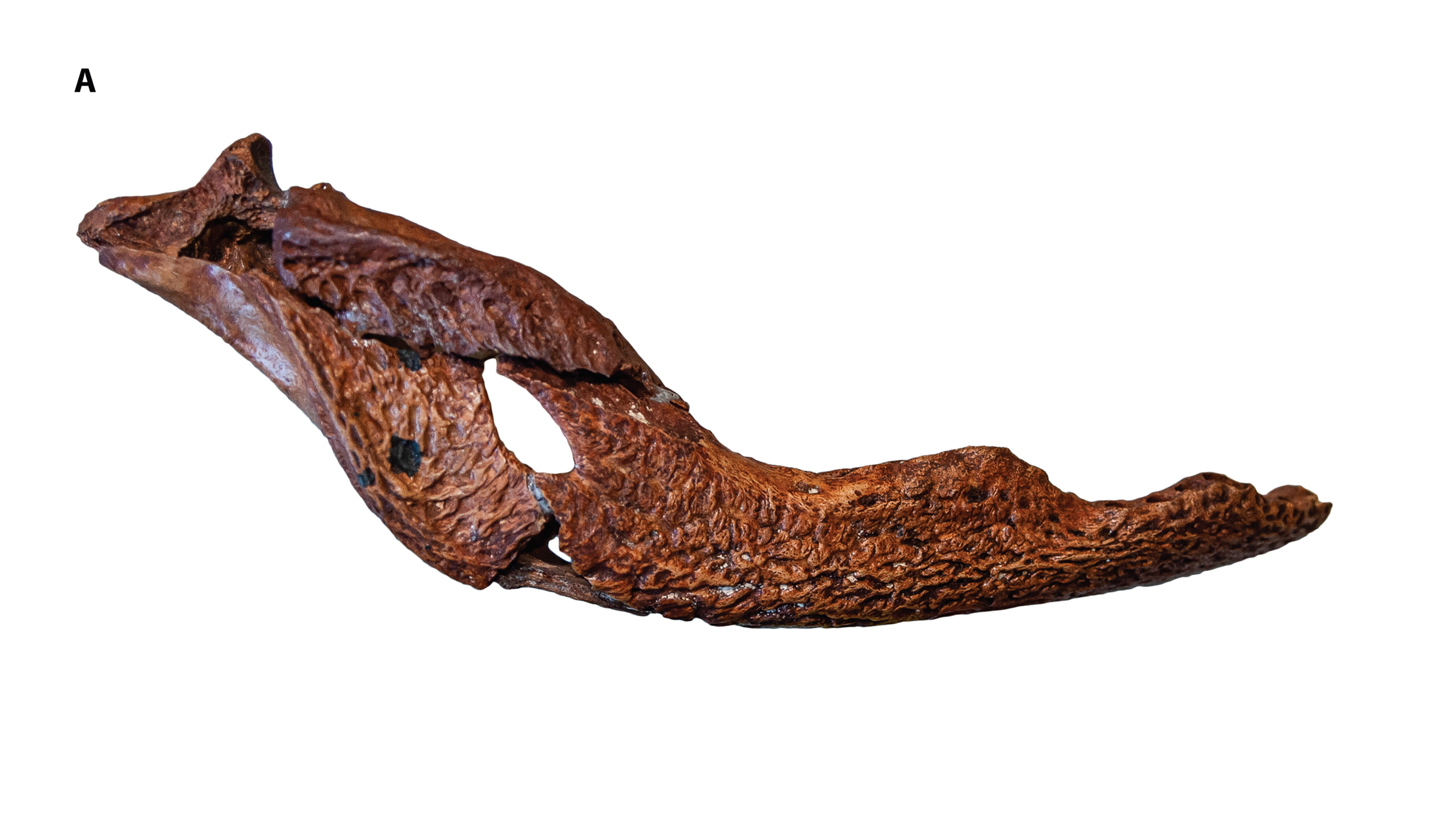
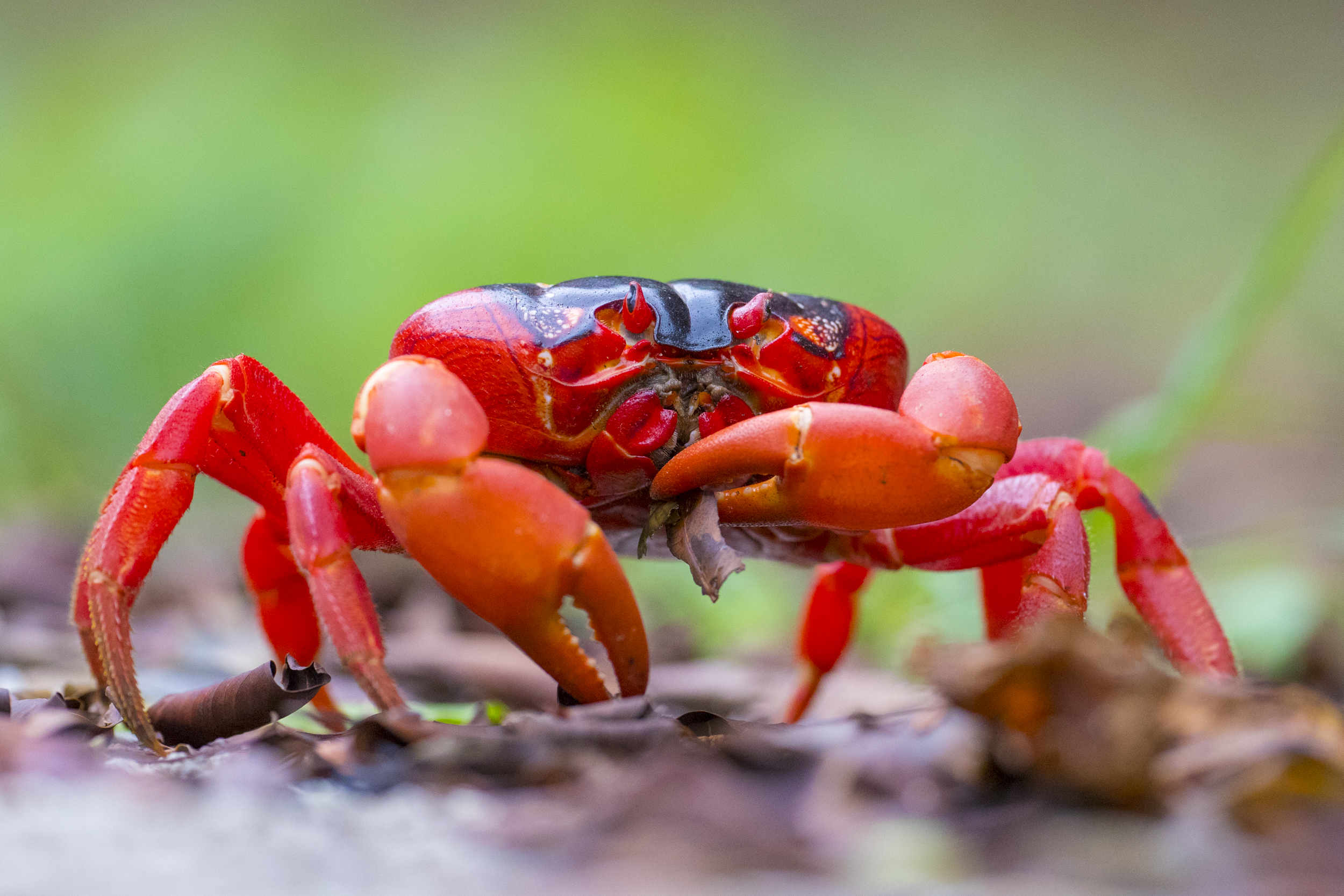
The robust jaws and blunt bulbous teeth of Mekosuchus inexpectatus may have been suited to crush hard-shelled prey like crabs and snails.

There are further important differences between the Neogene mainland species like the aforementioned Mekosuchus whitehunterensis and the much more recent insular taxa like Mekosuchus inexpectatus. While the former possessed bladed teeth well suited for cutting flesh, the more recent forms appear to have developed more robust cheek teeth that appear more suited for dealing with hard-shelled prey items. This would include various crustaceans, insects and even molluscs like the snail Placostylus, which is especially common on New Caledonia. Drawing parallels to dwarf crocodiles and dwarf caimans, Holt and colleagues have suggested that these island forms could have been nocturnal animals, foraging at night near the edge of small streams and on land.

The posterior dentition of Volia from Fiji might have also been suited to cracking small molluscs and insect cuticles, tho its just as possible that it was a terrestrial hunter, employing its slender, compressed teeth to dispatch of the local giant iguanas and flightless birds.

Despite the broad spectrum of skull forms seen across mekosuchines, not a single taxon has yet been confidently identified as a narrow-snouted fish eater akin to modern gharials or freshwater crocodiles. While this morphology was once applied to Ultrastenos, subsequent fossil finds have shown it to have been a much more generalized animal. Harpacochampsa meanwhile, historically placed within the family at times, has been more recently interpreted as a type of gharial not dissimilar to the later Gunggamarandu. There are multiple possible answers to this. On the one hand, it is simply possible that the presence of gharials prevented mekosuchines from trying to compete for this nische, which would not open until the disappearance of gharials during the Pliocene or Pleistocene and be filled by the narrow-snouted freshwater crocodiles. Another possibility is that piscivory and the associated adaptations would simply not have been a very viable ecology during the time. In the original description of Ultrastenos, it is highlighted how despite the abundance of freshwater biomes, the Riversleigh WHA is poor in fossil fish, with the authors proposing that a narrow rostrum could have been used to catch frogs and other small vertebrates. Notably, the rostra of neither Australian gavialoid are known in full, making the extent of their presumptive longirostry unclear. Finally, a third hypothesis proposes that mekosuchines were simply incapable of developing long and narrow jaws. This may find its reason in the ontogeny of the animal. A similar situation is seen in alligators, in which certain constraints during development prevent them from evolving this type of head-shape.

== Paleoenvironment ==
Though the presence of salt glands has been used to explain both the spread of mekosuchines into Australia and their later appearance on islands in the Pacific, genera of this family are generally associated with freshwater environments. This is already apparent in the earliest members, with both Kambara murgonensis and K. implexidens having been recovered from the lacustrine Tingamarra Local Fauna. Given the relatively small size of the local fish, none of which exceed a meter in length, it is thought that the deposits represent a shallow lake, possibly a billabong. Though it is believed that Kambara was dependent on freshwater, evidence shows that the environment was subject to dry conditions, in once instance leading to a mass death event. The younger species K. taraina and K. molnari, although not sympatric like their relatives, inhabited the Rundle Formation, interpreted to represent lagoonal mudflats. Though the similarity has been used as an indicator for the fact that Kambara was restricted to freshwater, the genus may have nonetheless been more widespread, with Holt and colleagues speculating that the animal might have been common across the inland waterways of Queensland.

=== Riversleigh and Lake Eyre ===
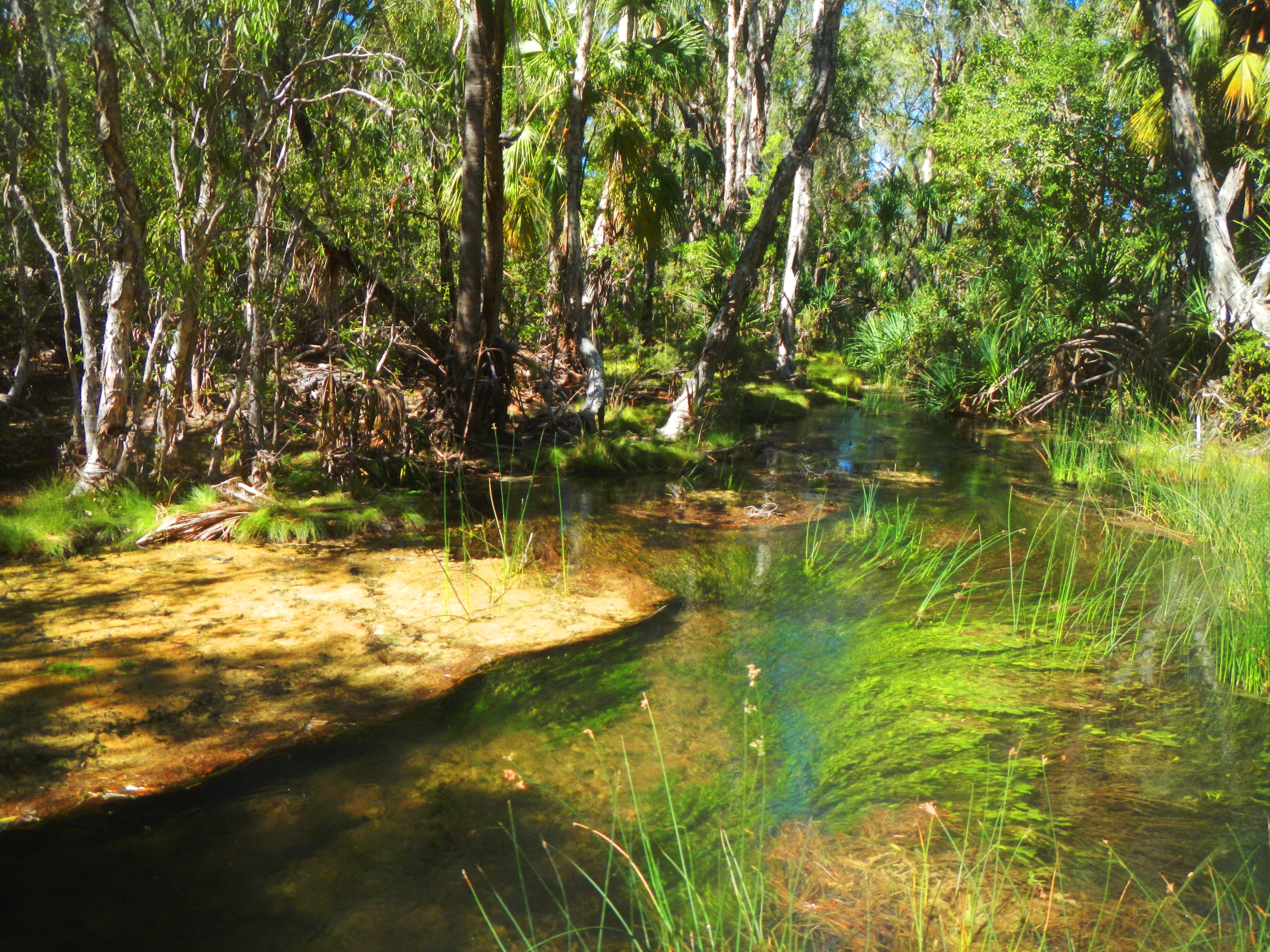
Mekosuchines likely inhabited a variety of freshwater environments, from shallow forest pools and oxbow shloughs to meandering rivers.

Australian mekosuchines had spread much further inland by the late Oligocene, inhabiting the Riversleigh World Heritage Area of Queensland and Pwerte Marnte Marnte in the Northern Territory, as well as various other parts of the Lake Eyre Basin in southern Australia. The type of environment present within the Riversleigh has historically been a controversial subject, but seems to represent some type of woodland that appears to have undergone multiple shifts throughout the regions history. It has been suggested that Late Oligocene and Early Miocene localities (like Low Lion and Whitehunter, home of taxa like Ultrastenos, Mekosuchus whitehunterensis, Baru wickeni and Quinkana meboldi) would fall into a dry period, and were thus dominated by open forests and woodlands, possibly also featuring sclerophyllous vegetation and deciduous vine thickets. It is thought that the climate grew wetter during Faunal Zones B and C, leading to a more prominent lowland rainforest environment being present during the deposition of the Ringtail Site (home to Trilophosuchus, Baru darrowi and Mekosuchus sanderi). This interpretation of the environment is supported by various factors like the high number of arboreal taxa, overall species richness and the presence of certain rainforest taxa like bubble nesting frogs, lyrebirds and certain bats. Eventually, the environment appears to have returned to drier open woodlands and forests by the time the Riversleigh transitioned into Faunal Zone D.

The geology of Late Oligocene and Early Miocene sites heavily features lacustrine and fluviate calcarenites, which together with the fauna (featuring not only crocodilians but also turtles and lungfish) suggests an important aquatic component, though other studies have argued for the absence of extensive rivers and wetlands. Still, other bodies of water were clearly present, possibly in the form of forest ponds and lakes. Similar pools are also known from later sites within the Riversleigh, such as the Ringtail Site, which in addition to crocodilians also preserves the fossils of the extinct platypus Obdurodon dicksoni, lungfish and turtles, with the primary terrestrial component of the sites fauna consisting of arboreal possums that give the locality its name.

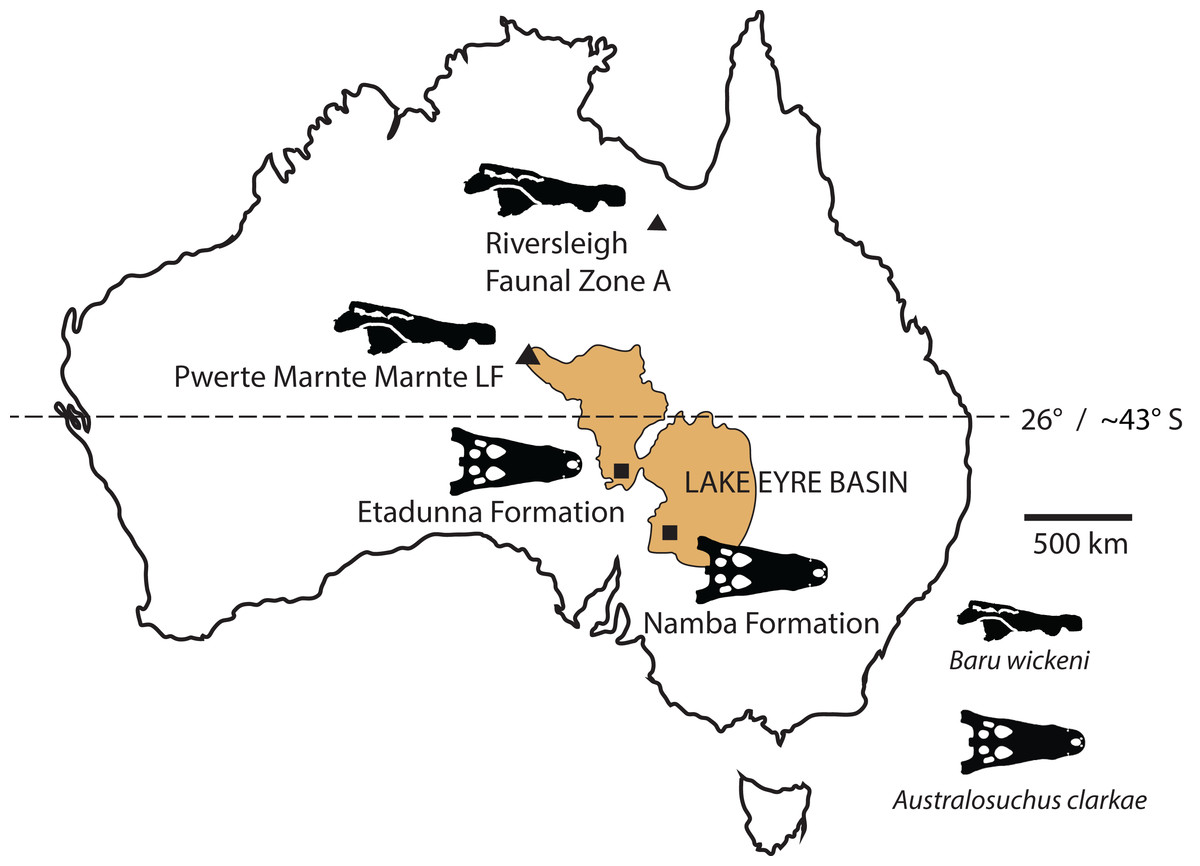
The separation of Baru wickeni and Australosuchus clarkae may reflect a prominent climate barrier across Oligocene Australia.

Other major Late Oligocene localities yielding mekosuchine material include the Etadunne, Namba and Wipajiri Formation of the South Australian Lake Eyre Basin. Like with the Riversleigh, the terrestrial environment has been described as tropical rainforest that was later replaced by dry sclerophyll forest. The aquatic environment was represented by widespread shallow lakes, which were home to a diverse assemblage of waterfowl. However, despite the environmental similarities to the Riversleigh and extensive bodies of freshwater, these southern formations only preserve a single mekosuchine: Australosuchus clarkae.

The stark contrast between the diverse mekosuchine fauna of the Riversleigh relative to the Australosuchus-dominated southern localities has led to some researchers to speculate on the reason for this divide. Initially, Willis hypothesized that this divide was caused by the localities being situated in different drainage basins, with the crocodilians unable to traverse enough land to spread from one to the other. This hypothesis however would later be debunked by Adam Yates, who described fossil material of Baru wickeni from the locality of Pwerte Marnte Marnte within the northern Lake Eyre Basin. Given that this proves the fact that both taxa did at least inhabit the same basin, another hypothesis for the apparent divide was proposed. Yates suggests that rather than being separated by some geographical barrier, the reason why Baru is restricted to the northern parts of Australia and vice versa lies in the climate of the continent. Yates notes that Baru is found no further south than 25°S while Australosuchus's northernmost occurrence lies at 27°S. Furthermore, the southernmost records of Australosuchus stem from localities at a latitude of 31°S, which accounting for continental drift, would correspond to a latitude of 45° to 50°S during the Oligocene. This is a notably higher latitude than inhabited by any modern crocodilian and may suggest that Australosuchus was uniquely cold resistant.

=== Middle Miocene-Pleistocene sites ===
The Middle and Late Miocene record of mekosuchines is primarily known from the localities of Bullock Creek (Camfield Beds) and the Alcoota Fossil site respectively. The former has been interpreted as possible dry vine forest surrounded by scrublands and more open woodlands, situated amidst a larger floodplain that featured various freshwater systems such as slow-moving rivers, seasonally shallow lakes, ponds and oxbow sloughs, home to an extensive fauna of small fish and freshwater gastropods. Crocodilians were seemingly separated by habitat preferences, with the gavialoid Harpacochampsa found in deeper waters like parts of the meandering river and the oxbow sloughs while the mekosuchine Baru seemingly preferred slow-moving streams in accordance with the hunting style proposed by Willis and colleagues. Alcoota shares much of its fauna with Bullock Creek, but is notably younger and shows a noticeable drop in freshwater and streambank taxa, which went from making up about half of the Bullock Creek fauna to only about a fourth of Alcoota's, a decline likely tied to the continuous aridification of Australia during this time. Still, the locality is thought to have been lacustrine in nature, featuring permanent bodies of water fed by springs that in times of increased rainfall may have expanded to form an enormous but very shallow lake. The terrestrial biomes of Alcoota may have featured savannah and localized forests according to Murray and Megirian, while Mao and Retallack propose that the environment was primarily composed of open woodlands and gallery forest, with grasses being fairly rare.

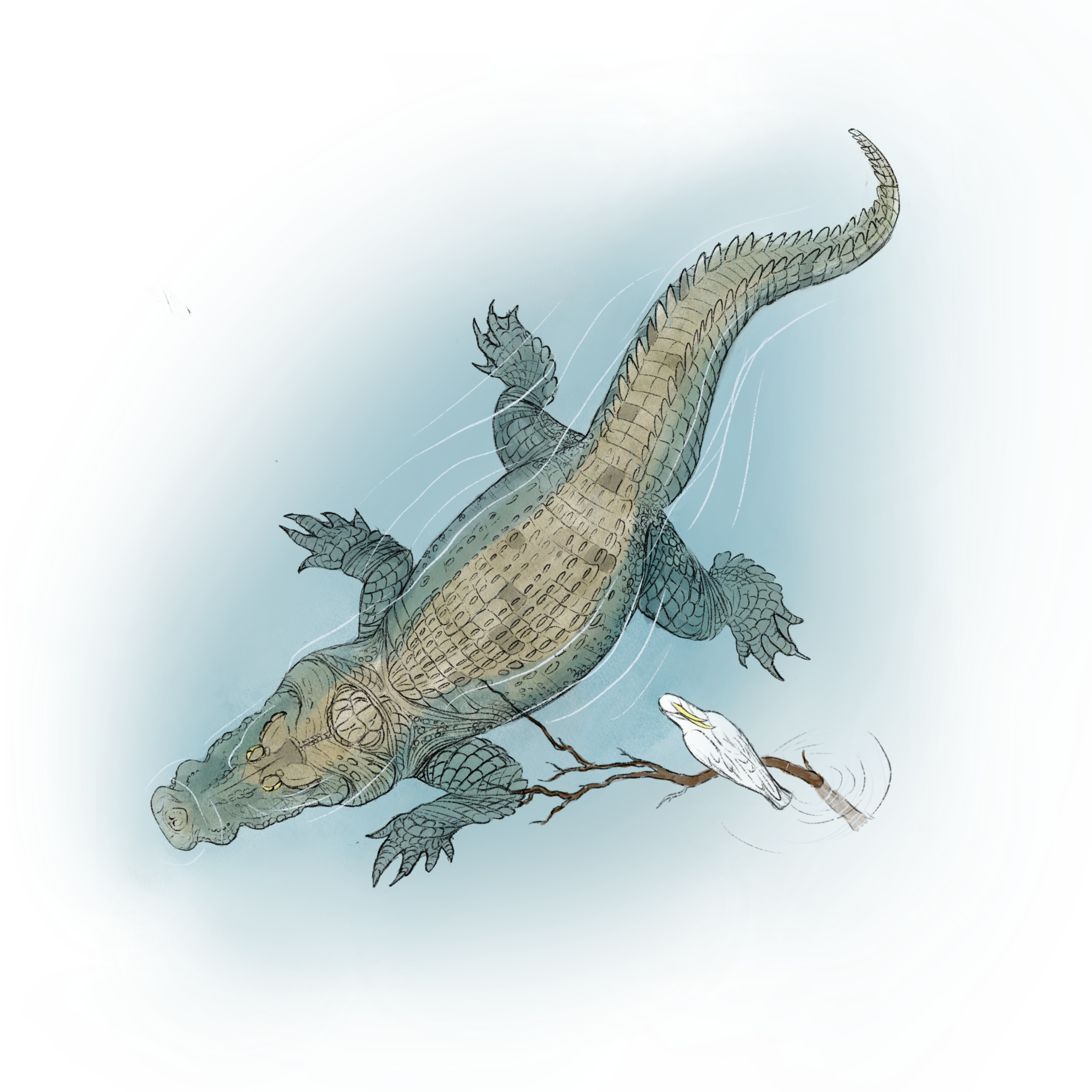
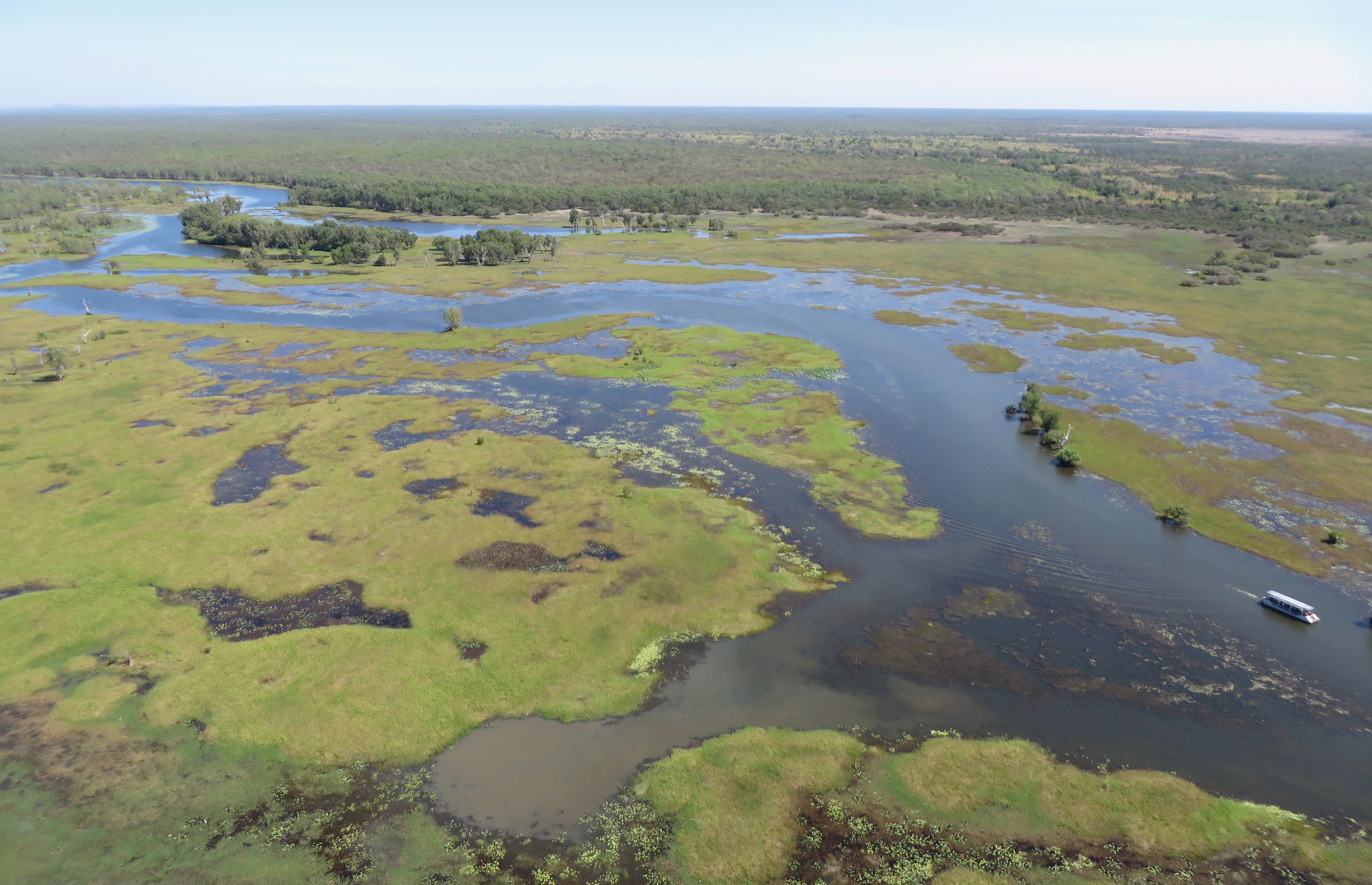
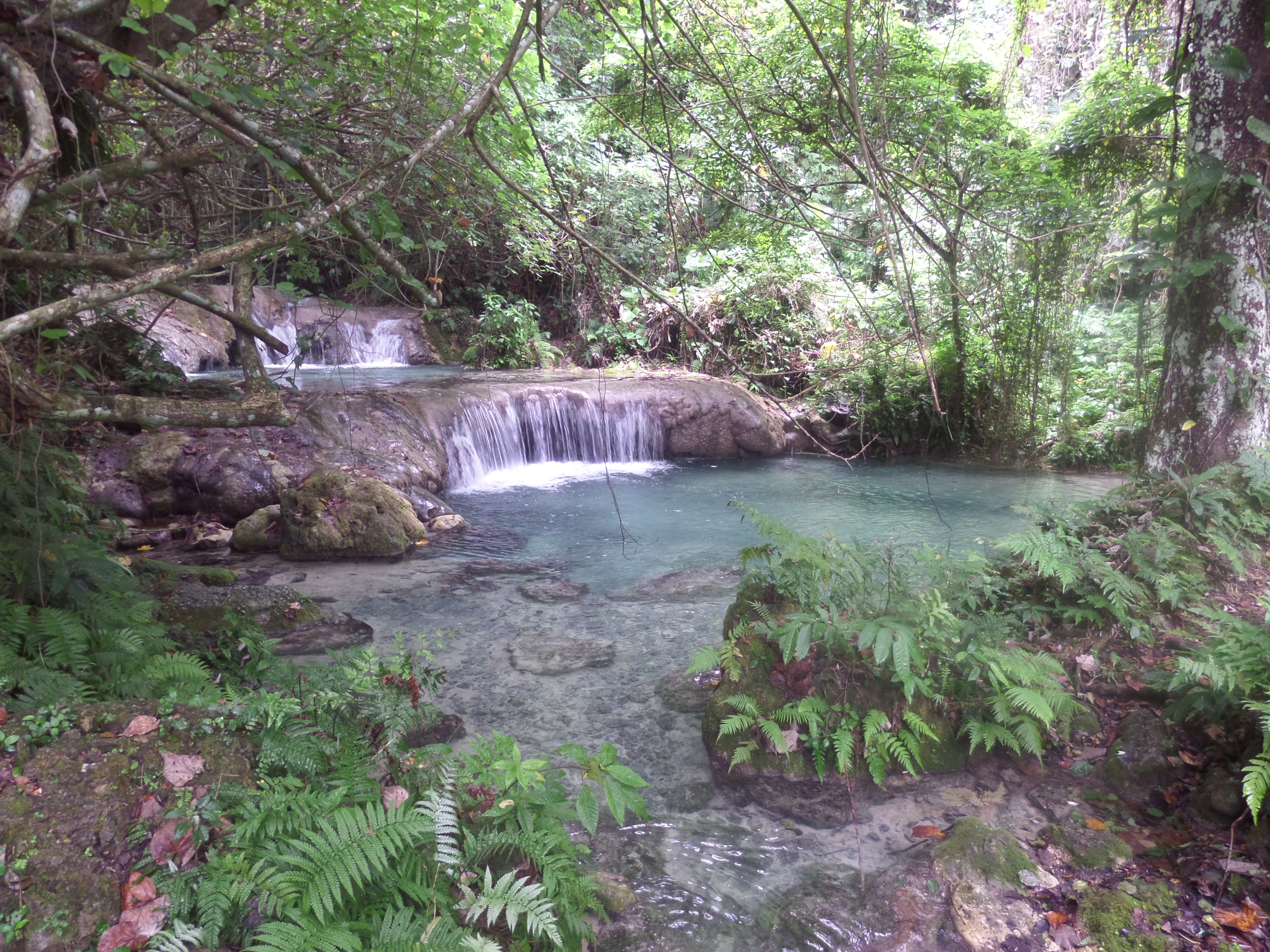
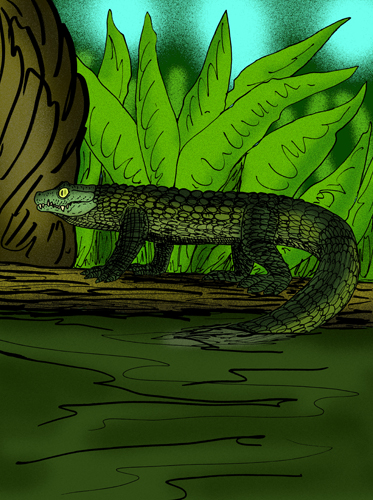
While continental mekosuchines like Paludirex (top) largely relied on inland freshwater systems, smaller insular taxa might have found refuge near rainforest streams on islands like Vanuatu (bottom).

One thing showcased by both localities is the impact of the climate change that Australia faced during the Miocene. The presence of certain minerals, namely evaporites and lithoclastic carbonate deposits, seems to suggest that Bullock Creek underwent periods of dry, possibly even semi-arid conditions. The deposits further indicate that these minerals were not formed in a single event, but rather sequentially, possibly due to seasonally changing conditions causing droughts. Similarly, though spring-fed, the freshwater systems of Alcoota were likewise ephemeral and threatened by droughts. The fossil preservation supports this idea, with some remains at Alcoota seemingly deposited during "waterhole tethering", when animals would concentrate and die around slowly shrinking bodies of water, with survivors crushing the remains of the deceased. It is hypothesized that one especially severe period of aridification was responsible for the extinction of most Oligocene and Miocene mekosuchine groups towards the end of the Miocene.

Mekosuchines did however survive this period in less affected areas of Australia and diversified once more during the Pliocene. Taxa of this time period include Paludirex and Kalthifrons as well as Quinkana, which survived the Miocene-Pliocene faunal turnover. However, with the exception of the potentially more terrestrial Quinkana, these new forms remained highly dependent on freshwater. Pliocene mekosuchines are known from Bluff Downs (Allingham Formation) in Queensland, among other places. Bluff Downs has been interpreted as preserving an environment similar to today's Kakadu National Park, with Thomson and Mackness proposing suggesting the presence of riparian rainforests or vine thickets. Aquatic environments possibly consisted of rivers, creeks and lagoons as indicated by the presence of several species of chelid turtles, anhingas and pygmy geese. Further south, the Lake Eyre Basin also continued to support mekosuchine populations, sharing Quinkana with Bluff Downs and also preserving the bones of Kalthifrons as the regions semi-aquatic crocodilian. The Tirari Formation is noticeably drier than the environment of the underlying Miocene formations inhabited by Australosuchus, but nonetheless much wetter than the region is today. It may have housed fan-deltas, lakes and floodplains, and was home to many freshwater taxa beyond the crocodilians, including ducks, flamingos, anhingas, cormorants, egrets and pelicans. Still, the Tirari Formation exemplifies the aridification of Australia, with its freshwater bodies less extensive than the lakes of the Etadunna and Namba Formations that preceded it. The Tirari Formation and Kalthifrons are furthermore key examples for the threat that aridification continued to pose to mekosuchines, with the type locality of Kalthifrons representing a watering hole that dried up in a drought, killing the aquatic taxa that lived in it.

During the Pleistocene, aridification caused another extinction event among mekosuchines. Given the groups preference for the inland freshwater systems of Australia, the collapse of said systems and associated change to more open environments wiped out both semi-aquatic taxa like Paludirex as well as the more terrestrial Quinkana. Though rainfall eventually increased again, settling on the levels of precipitation seen today, this was too late to save Australia's inland freshwater systems.

Animals like Mekosuchus inexpectatus were the last mekosuchines, and inhabited the tropical islands of the South Pacific like Vanuatu, Fiji and New Caledonia. They may have lived in the rainforests of these islands, spending their life in or close to small rainforest streams.
