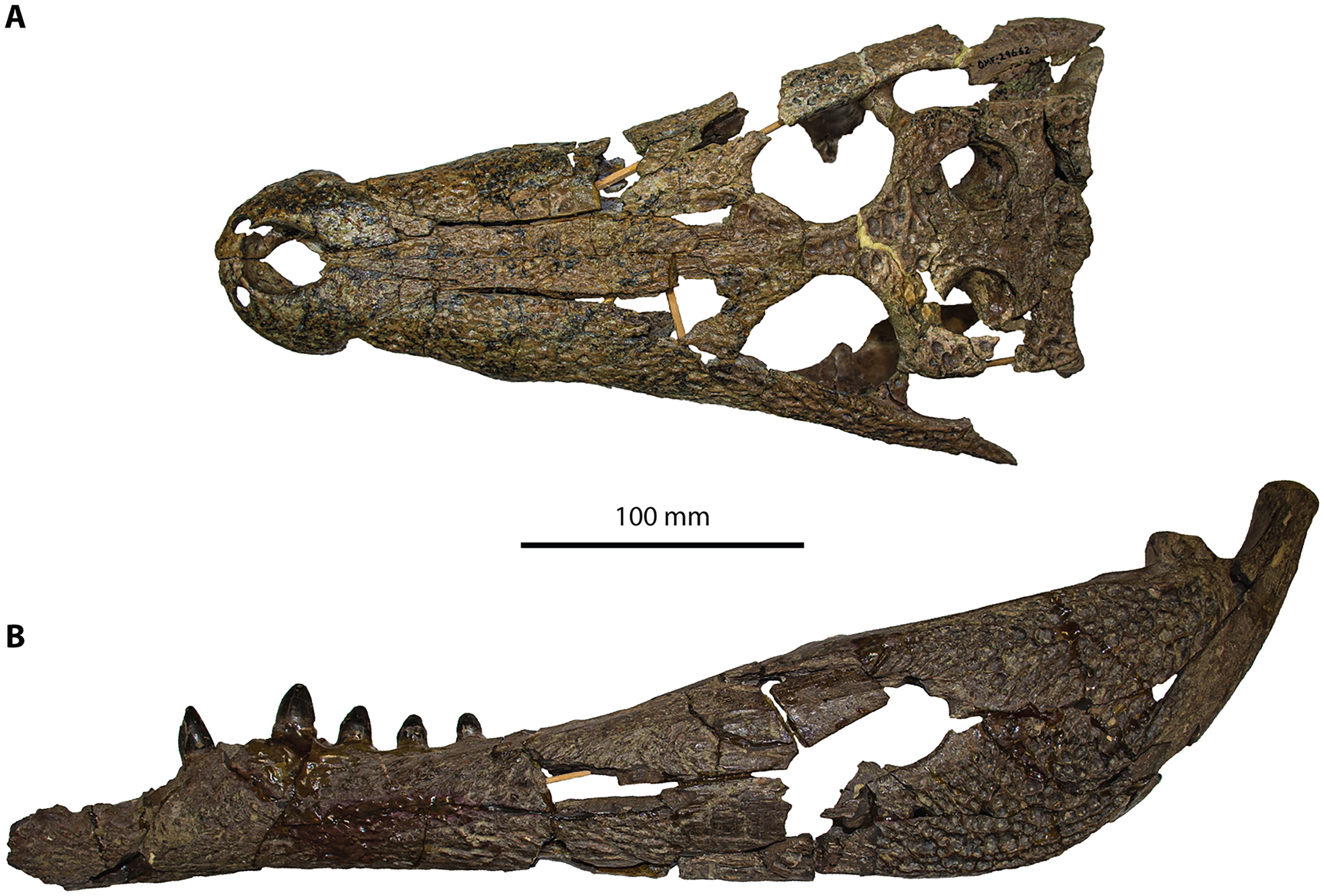
- The skull of Kambara implexidens and the lower jaw of Kambara molnari.

Scientific classification
- Kingdom: Animalia
- Phylum: Chordata
- Class: Reptilia
- Order: Crocodylia
- Clade: †Mekosuchinae
- Genus: †Kambara; Willis, Molnar & Scanlon, 1993

Species
- †K. murgonensis Willis, Molnar & Scanlon, 1993 (type); †K. implexidens Salisbury & Willis, 1996; †K. molnari Holt, Salisbury & Willis, 2005; †K. taraina Buchanan, 2009

= Kambara =

Kambara Temporal range: Eocene, 54.6 Ma

Extinct genus of reptiles

Kambara is an extinct genus of mekosuchine crocodylian that lived during the Eocene epoch in Australia. It is generally thought to have been a semi-aquatic generalist, living a lifestyle similar to many of today's crocodiles. Four species are currently recognised, the sympatric Kambara murgonensis and Kambara implexidens from sediments near Murgon, the poorly preserved Kambara molnari from the Rundle Formation and the youngest of the four, Kambara taraina, also from the Rundle Formation. Kambara were medium-sized crocodilians, with mature specimens generally reaching lengths from 3–4 m (9.8–13.1 ft).

Species of Kambara are easiest differentiated by the different occlusal patterns of their teeth. While K. murgonensis had an overbite similar to a modern alligator, both K. implexidens and K. taraina had interlocking dentition much more similar to true crocodiles. K. molnari, although incompletely known, seems to represent an intermediate form.

Despite plentiful fossils, the ecology of Kambara is poorly understood. The general shape of the skull, which is flattened, and the environment the fossils were deposited in, all suggest that they were semi-aquatic ambush predators like modern crocodilians. However, subtle differences in the postcranial remains, especially the limb bones, suggest that Kambara may have been better adapted at walking on land than the two crocodile species still inhabiting Australia today, the saltwater and freshwater crocodile. While this could suggest that it was faster on land than living crocodilians, it does not necessarily mean that it was terrestrial like some later mekosuchines are thought to have been. Another question regarding its ecology is posed by the coexistence of K. murgonensis and K. implexidens at Murgon. It is unclear how exactly these two species differed in their niche, but they did differ notably in their anatomy, with the latter being slightly more gracile and with interlocking teeth. It is also possible that the two species didn't coexist at all, but instead were driven together by drought.

As the oldest described and named mekosuchine, Kambara is considered an important piece in understanding the evolutionary history and origin of this group. Phylogenetic analyses recover it as one of the earliest diverging mekosuchines, but recent studies have commonly found other taxa like Kalthifrons or Australosuchus to be the oldest diverging. Other studies suggest that Kambara was no mekosuchine at all, but said results are not supported by all authors.

== History and naming ==
Remains of Kambara are exclusively known from the Paleogene of Australia, with the first remains found in rock units of what may be part of the Oakdale Sandstone Formation near the township of Murgon, Queensland. Although known for half a century, the material was first formally described by Ralph Molnar in 1982, who reported a lower jaw bone he believed to belong to a Miocene crocodylid. While noting similarities to other Australian crocodilians, notably Australosuchus (named nine years later), Molnar refrained from naming the material due to the fragmentary nature of the dentary.

The mid 1980s saw the discovery of mammal remains in the area, leading to increased study and revised dating. This new-found attention led to the discovery of several additional crocodilian fossils, including a largely complete skull (QM F21115) collected in 1991. The genus Kambara, with K. murgonensis as the type species, was finally established in 1993 by Paul Willis, Ralph Molnar and John D. Scanlon, who tentatively referred all Murgon crocodile fossils to this taxon. Even at this time it was noted that Kambara seemingly showed a high degree of variation among its fossils, in particular regarding the better preserved lower jaws. For this reason, it was suggested that the fossils could belong to multiple species of a single genus. This was confirmed when a second species, Kambara implexidens, was named three years later on the basis of new material collected from the same locality, with some of the previously recovered fossils now being assigned to this taxon.

A third species was named in 2005 in the form of K. molnari, although it stands out as the species with the least amount of available material. Like with the species before it, K. molnari was known for a while, with the type specimen found in 1991. However the material was not closely examined until the description of K. implexidens.

The most recent addition to this genus was K. taraina, named in 2009 by Lucas A. Buchanan. Although the type description is limited to the skull material (two crania and a lower jaw), which is easily comparable to the previously established species, Buchanan takes note of a "considerable amount" of postcranial remains. These remains were partly described in a thesis, but unlike the cranial material have not been formally published. An exception to this is the humerus, which was covered by Stein et al. and noted to differ greatly from modern forms. K. taraina has been recovered from the Rundle Formation, however, it was not sympatric with K. molnari, which stems from older stratigraphic layers.

In the type description the name Kambara is stated to derive from an Aboriginal word for crocodile, however, it is not specified which language in particular, only that it stems from the Queensland language group.

== Species ==
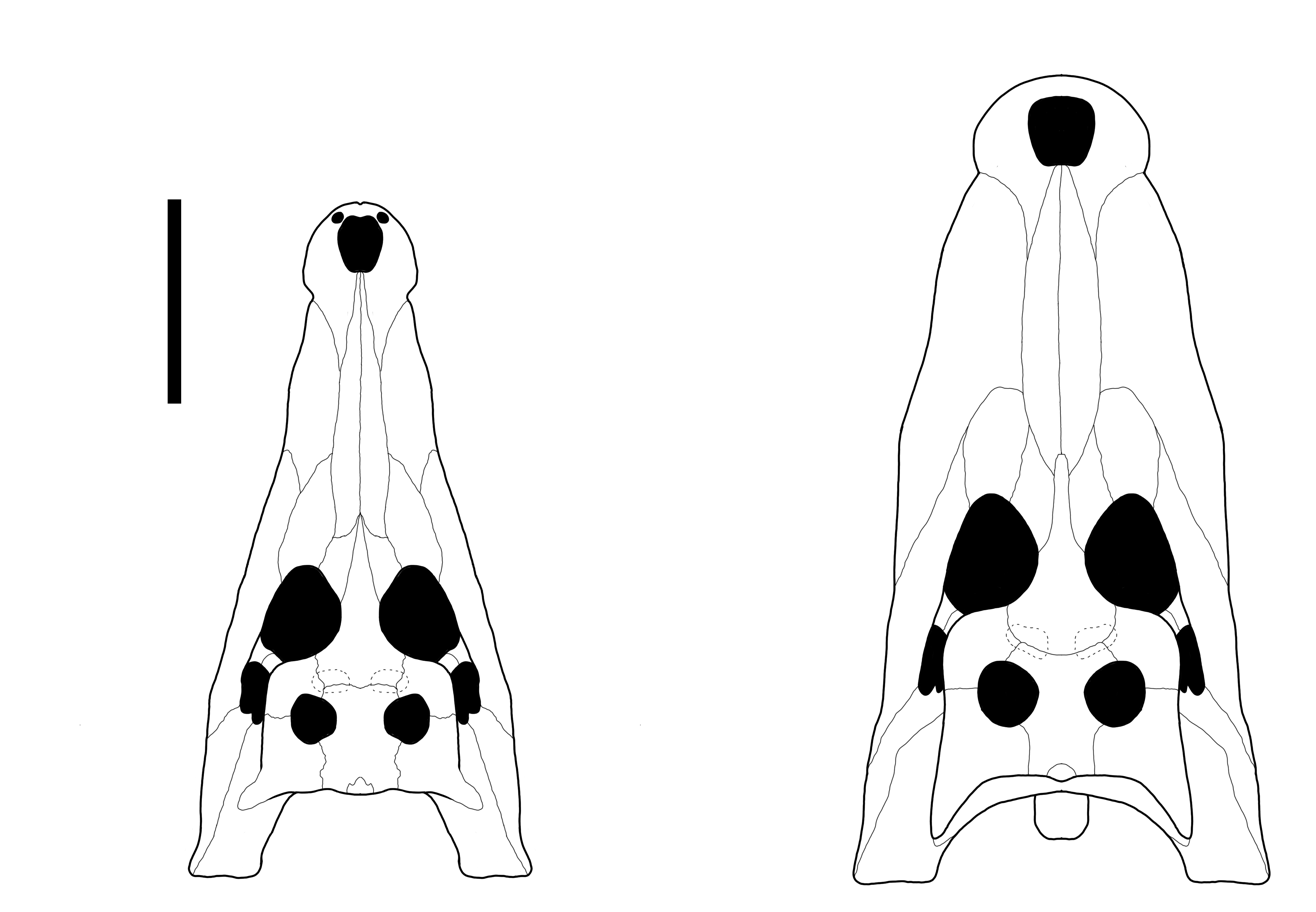
Comparison between Kambara implexidens and Kambara murgonensis, scalebar = 10 cm (3.9 in).

- K. implexidens

The fossils of K. implexidens were found alongside those of K. murgonensis in the Boat Mountain area near Murgon, Queensland, indicating that the two species coexisted. Because of this, K. implexidens was not recognised as a distinct species until the discovery of nearly complete skulls in 1993, clearly showing major differences with the type species. Among these differences is the fact that the teeth of K. implexidens interlock, rather than forming an overbite. It is this fact that the species name derives from. Additionally, the skull of this species was relatively more gracile, as are this species' teeth.

- K. molnari

The third species of Kambara to be described, K. molnari is known from a partial mandible and several isolated remains all collected from the Rundle Formation. It is the least well preserved of all Kambara species, but has enough differences to the other forms to be considered distinct. Most notably, the teeth appear to be intermediate between the overbite of K. murgonensis and the interlocking dentition of K. implexidens and K. taraina. It was named in honour of Ralph Molnar for his consistent contributions to mekosuchine research.

- K. murgonensis

The type species of the genus, remains of K. murgonensis were part of the Tingamarra Fauna and have been found in areas overlying the Oakdale Sandstone Formation. It was named for Murgon, the closest township to the type locality. It was a moderately robust animal with a skull much wider than that of the contemporary K. implexidens.

- K. taraina

The youngest species of Kambara, it stems from the Kerosene Creek Member of the Rundle Formation, which means that it did not coexist with K. molnari. Like with K. implexidens, the teeth of K. taraina interlock and thus set it apart from the other known species. The species name derives from the dialect of the Darumbal people and simply means crocodile. This language was chosen as a proxy for that of the Bailai due to the links between the two cultures.

== Description ==
The skull of Kambara appears typically crocodilian, being roughly triangular with a rostrum that begins relatively narrow and continues to widen towards the back. The precise degree to which the snout tapers differs between species. K. murgonensis for instance is described as being moderately broad-snouted with a robust build. By comparison, the skull of K. implexidens, although still platyrostral, is notably slender compared to its contemporary relative. Similarly, the teeth are also more slender. The skull table of Kambara was relatively flat, lacking the raised edges seen in today's crocodiles, but instead multiple specimens across species show the presence of well developed pits just before the supratemporal fenestrae.

Ever since the first material of Kambara was described, it was recognised as a highly variable genus, retaining certain key traits but differing notably in others. As noted by Buchanan, the most prominent of these differentiating traits centre around the anatomy of the retroarticular process and the dentition. Regarding the retroarticular process, an important attachment site for the abductor musculature, K. taraina stands out as having a long, high and wide process, offering a greater surface area for the musculature to attach to. By comparison, the retroarticular processes in older species are less well developed, with that of K. molnari being described as long but narrow, while that of K. implexidens was short and low.

=== Toothrow and dentition ===
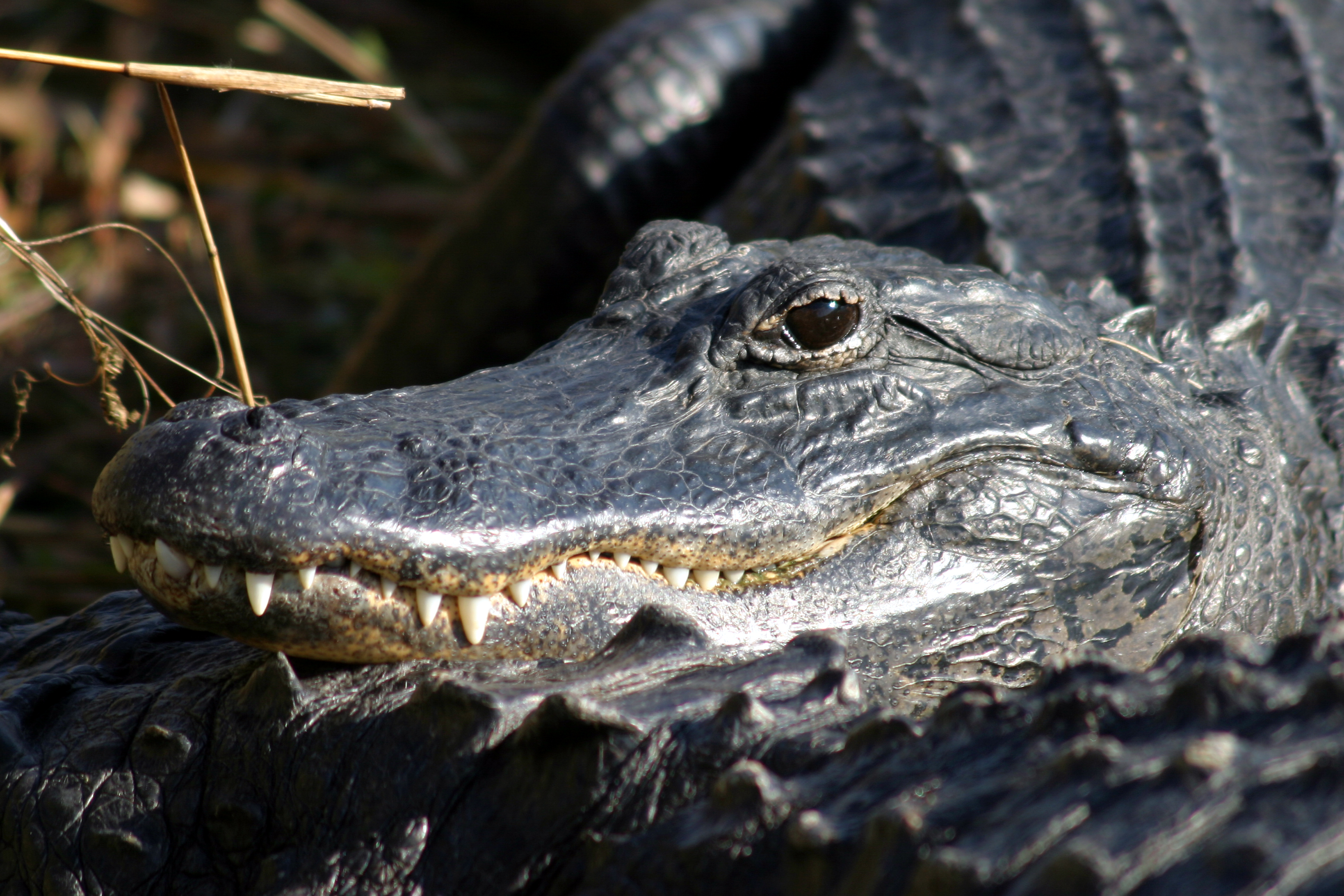
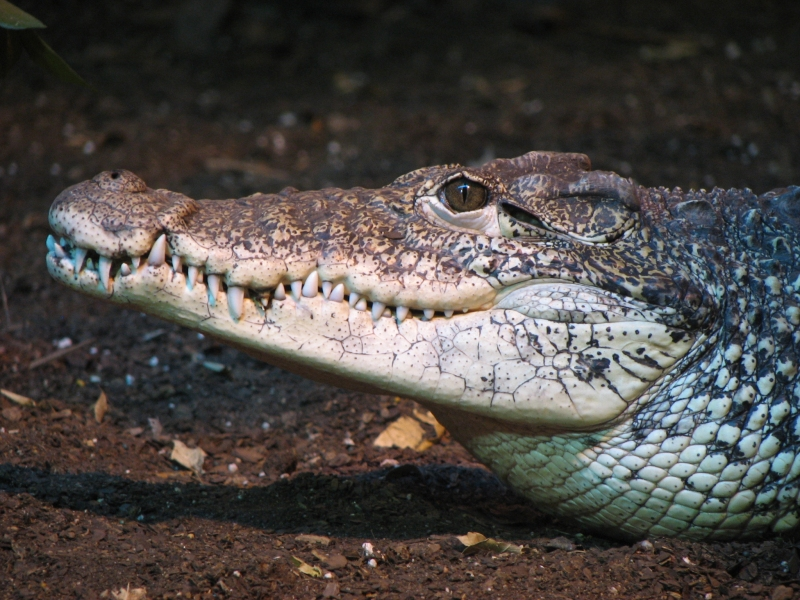
K. murgonensis had an overbite, much like modern alligators (top), whereas K. implexidens and K. taraina had interlocking teeth similar to that of a crocodile (bottom).

The toothrow across all four known species of Kambara differs significantly and is used to set them apart. Generally, three different morphologies can be observed, with the difference being primarily expressed through how the upper and lower toothrow interact with one another. As in many other crocodilians, the dental margin of Kambara appears wave-like, though it is more gentle than some other mekosuchines.

In K. murgonensis, the teeth of the upper jaw overlap those of the lower jaw, giving it an overbite similar to that of an alligator.

However, both K. implexidens and K. taraina differ significantly, as neither preserve fully overlapping dentition. Instead, distinct occlusal pits reveal that the teeth slid in between each other when the jaw was closed. This means that the teeth of these two species would interlock in a fashion much more similar to what is observed in species of Crocodylus. In K. implexidens, the first teeth of the lower jaw slide into very pronounced pits that pierce the bones of the upper jaw, emerging on its upper surface in front of the nostrils. The remaining premaxillary and maxillary teeth of K. implexidens clearly interlock with each other based on the presence of the aforementioned occlusal pits between the individual tooth sockets up to the ninth tooth of the upper jaw. After this point, the pits are located further medially. This is also confirmed by the pits present in the lower jaw, indicating interlocking teeth in some areas and a slight overlap further back in the jaw. The enlarged fifth tooth of the maxilla does however occupy more space, with its pit being set much further laterally than any of the others. Regardless, this clearly sets not just the skulls but also the dentaries apart from those assigned to K. murgonensis. In K. taraina the teeth clearly interlock in the premaxilla as well, however, while the first pair of dentary teeth also extend into the bone, they do not breach the dorsal surface as in K. implexidens. Regardless, much like those of K. implexidens, the dentition of K. taraina is characterised by being interlocking.

The third type is observed in K. molnari, which shows a somewhat intermediate condition between the overbite of K. murgonensis and the more extensive interlocking dentition of K. implexidens. Around the seventh and eight dentary teeth, as well as from the twelfth to seventeenth, the teeth appear to have interlocked. However, the tenth to twelfth teeth of the dentary are confluent, meaning they are too closely spaced to interlock with those of the upper jaw, necessitating an overbite in this area. This clearly sets it apart from all other species of Kambara and more closely resembles animals such as Borealosuchus and Diplocynodon.

All teeth are slightly compressed side to side and possess distinct carinae (cutting edges), but are not ziphodont like in some later mekosuchines. Both this compression and the development of the edges is strongest towards the front of the jaw and gradually grows weaker further back in the toothrow, while also becoming more bulbous and peg-like. While the number of premaxillary teeth is consistent, the amount of teeth in the maxilla and dentary varies. K. taraina has the lowest number of teeth in the maxillae (and thus throughout the upper jaw) with only 14 teeth on either side. The number is unknown for K. molnari, while both K. implexidens and K. murgonensis possess 16 teeth in either maxilla. The lower jaw contains 17 or 18 dentary teeth.

=== Postcrania ===
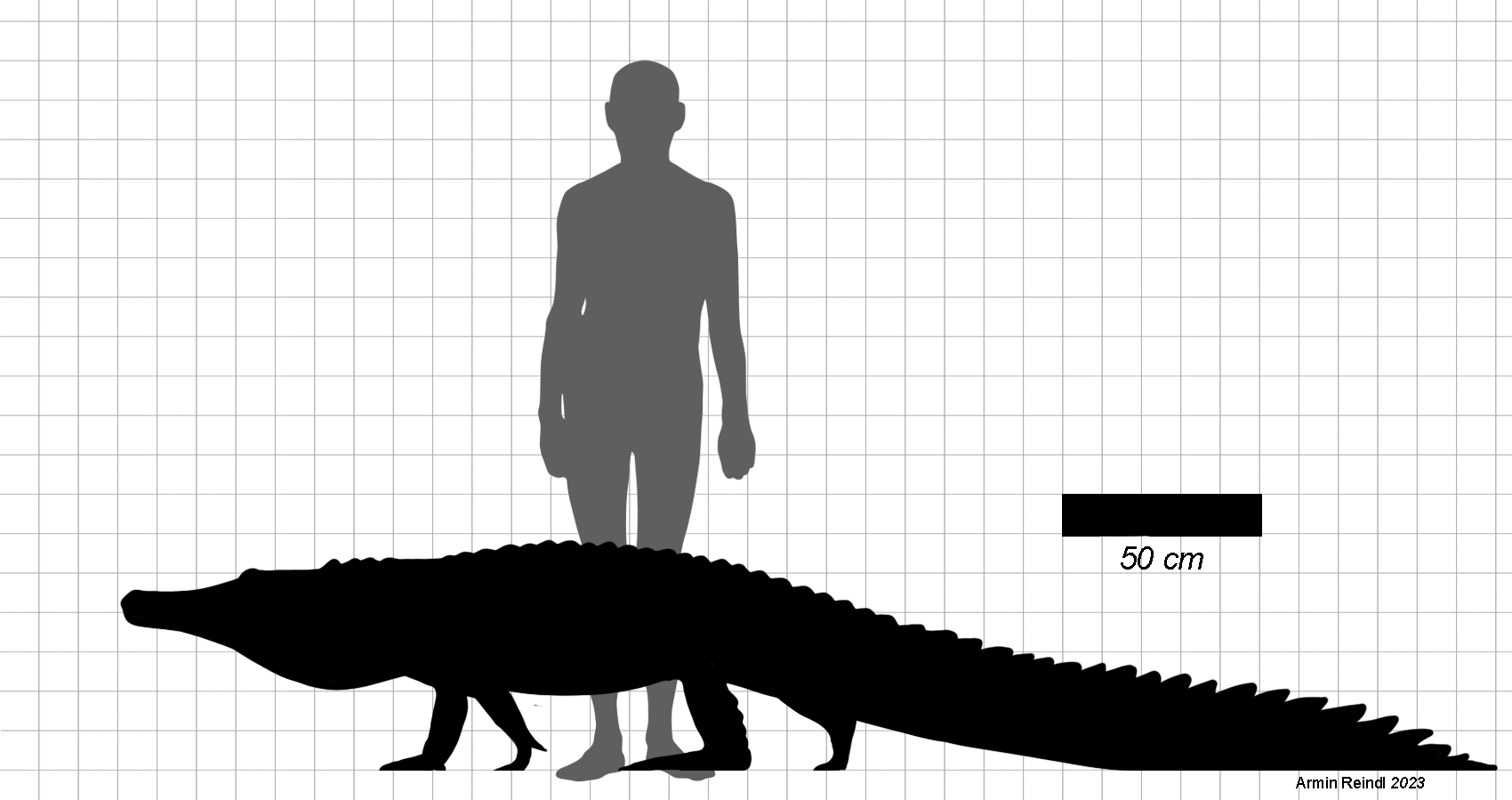
Size comparison of Kambara implexidens

Although a lot of postcranial material of Kambara has been found, most of said material remains undescribed with the exception of the humerus, which had been studied and compared to the equivalent bones in saltwater and freshwater crocodiles. In both of these modern forms, the deltopectoral crest is offset medially from the lateral margin of the shaft. The apex of the crest is also directed medially, which essentially places it just above the midline of the shaft. The deltapectoral crest sits at a right angle relative to the ventral face of the humeral shaft. However, in Kambara things are notably different. Neither the deltapectoral crest nor its apex are directed medially, with the crest as a whole being just above the lateral margin of the shaft and the apex being directed ventrally. The right angle formed by the crest and shaft however remains. This is associated with the torsion of the shaft. In the modern forms, the humerus is given a sigmoid shape by the fact that the articulating surfaces, the parts of the bone that connect to the joints, are at an angle to each other. The humerus of Kambara meanwhile is much straighter, with both surfaces being level to each other. As a consequence, the shaft of the humerus in Kambara is not lengthened as is the case in modern Australian crocodiles.

There are also differences concerning the distal end, the end towards the toes rather than the hip. Here, modern Australian crocodiles have flat medial and lateral surfaces bordering the condyles, which makes the end look somewhat quadrilateral. In Kambara, the dorsal and ventral faces are compressed, which in turn lengthens the medial and lateral condyles, while also directing these surfaces towards the midline. The profile of the distal end is subsequently hexagonal. Profile and size of the medial and lateral condyles in saltwater and freshwater crocodiles are nearly identical, but very different in Kambara.

Additional known elements of the postcranial skeleton include shoulder blades, coracoids, bones of the lower arm, finger bone, pelvic bones, hindlimbs as well as multiple parts of the spinal cord, including nearly the entire cervical series, several dorsal and tail vertebrae as well as lumbar vertebrae in articulation. Ribs and chevrons are likewise known. Most of this material however have not seen formal publication and are only described in Buchanan's PhD thesis. Their general proportions seem to resemble modern crocodiles.

=== Size ===
Kambara was a medium-sized crocodilian, smaller than the more recent mekosuchines Baru and Paludirex. The holotype specimen of K. implexidens, which may be a subadult, has been estimated to have been 2.5 m (8 ft 2 in), while a much larger mandible suggests lengths of up to 3.5 m (11 ft). K. murgonensis is thought to have been of similar size, albeit with a more robust build. The same applies to K. molnari, which was described as reaching lengths from 3–4 m (9.8–13.1 ft).

== Phylogeny ==
Similarities between a then unnamed Kambara and other extinct Australian crocodilians were noted since the description of the Murgon mandible in 1982. By the 1993 description, the idea of an endemic Australian crocodilian radiation was better established, at the time including Australosuchus, Pallimnarchus, Baru and Quinkana. Willis and colleagues took this a step further by including Mekosuchus in this group and redefining Mekosuchidae as Mekosuchinae. No detailed phylogenetic analysis was conducted for Kambara murgonensis in 1993, but it was still recognised as the basalmost member of Mekosuchinae. Subsequent papers largely supported this suggestion, typically recovering Kambara as one of the earliest branching mekosuchines, although other taxa may be found as slightly more basal or on an even level as part of a polytomy. For instance, a 2018 study by Lee and Yates, using genetic, morphological and stratigraphic data, found Kambara to be second only to Australosuchus, whereas Ristevski et al. alternatively found Australosuchus, Kalthifrons or Kalthifrons and Kambara to be the basalmost forms. In both cases, Kambara was found to be a mekosuchine.

- - Mekosuchinae
    - Australosuchus†
    - - - Kambara taraina†
        - Kambara implexidens†
      - - Kambara murgonensis†
        - - - - Kalthifrons†
              - Pallimnarchus†
            - - Baru wickeni†
              - - Baru darrowi†
                - Baru Alcoota†
          - - - Bullock Creek taxon†
              - "Baru" huberi†
            - - Volia†
              - - Mekosuchus†
                - - Trilophosuchus†
                  - Quinkana†
  - Longirostres

- - Crocodyloidea
    - "Crocodylus" megarhinus†
    - - Mekosuchinae
        - Kalthifrons aurivellensis†
        - - - Kambara implexidens†
            - - Kambara taraina†
              - Kambara murgonensis†
          - - Australosuchus clarkae†
            - - - "Baru" huberi†
                - - Trilophosuchus rackhami†
                  - - Volia athollandersoni†
                    - - Mekosuchus whitehunterensis†
                      - - Mekosuchus sanderi†
                        - Mekosuchus inexpectatus†
              - - Paludirex spp.†
                - - Baru spp.†
                  - Quinkana spp.†
      - Crocodylidae

Although Mekosuchinae as a monophyletic clade became a well established group in the years following Kambara's description, it is not without competing ideas. This in particular affects the position of Kambara. In a study dealing exclusively with morphology, Kambara was still recovered as a mekosuchine, however, the overall make up of the clade was changed significantly. The study found Kambara in a basal position and including "Asiatosuchus" nanlingensis, a Paleocene crocodyloid no longer believed to be related to Asiatosuchus. Additionally, both Quinkana and Australosuchus were not found to be mekosuchines in this analysis. Another, much more different placement was also shown in Ristevski et al. In addition to the monophyletic Mekosuchinae recovered by the vast majority of their analysis, two more novel results were also found. These alternative topologies render Mekosuchinae paraphyletic, including the clade Orientalosuchina, but excluding Australosuchus and Kambara. Instead, these trees recover Kambara as an early diverging crocodyloid and immediate sister to Crocodylidae. However, these results are a minority within the team's analysis and even then nodal support for paraphyletic Mekosuchinae is considered to be poor by the authors.

- - - - Kambara implexidens
      - - Kambara taraina
        - - Kambara murgonensis
          - "Asiatosuchus" nanlingensis
    - - - Baru darrowi
        - Baru wickeni
      - - "Baru" huberi
        - - Trilophosuchus rackhami
          - - Ultrastenos willisi
            - Mekosuchus whitehunterensis
            - Mekosuchus sanderi
            - Mekosuchus inexpectatus
  - - Australosuchus clarkae
    - Crocodylidae
      - Osteolaeminae
      - Crocodylinae
        - - Quinkana
          - "Crocodylus" megarhinus
        - Crocodylus

- Crocodilia
  - Alligatoroidea
  - - Planocraniidae
    - - - "Asiatosuchus" germanicus
        - Mekosuchinae
          - - Kalthifrons aurivellensis
            - - Quinkana spp.
              - - Baru spp.
                - Paludirex spp.
          - - Orientalosuchina
              - Krabisuchus siamogallicus
              - - Orientalosuchus naduongensis
                - - Jiangxisuchus nankangensis
                  - Eoalligator chunyii
            - - Dongnanosuchus hsui
              - - "Baru" huberi
                - - Volia athollandersoni
                  - Trilophosuchus rackhami
                  - Mekosuchus spp.
      - - Prodiplocynodon langi
        - - - "Crocodylus" affinis
            - "Crocodylus" depressifrons
          - - "Crocodylus" acer
            - Brachyuranochampsa eversolei
          - Longirostres
            - Gavialoidea
            - - Australosuchus clarkae
              - - - Kambara implexidens
                  - - Kambara taraina
                    - Kambara murgonensis
                - Crocodylidae

Initially, it was thought that Kambara murgonensis was the basal most species of the genus, which would have rendered the overbite characteristic for this species the ancestral condition. However, the discovery of Kambara molnari with its intermediate form, various undetermined crocodilians of the time with interlocking teeth and phylogenetic analysis all seem to suggest that the genus actually began with interlocking dentition, acquiring the overbite later. Recent phylogenies consistently point towards K. implexidens as the basal most species of Kambara, although K. molnari is typically removed due to the limited nature of its material.

== Paleobiology ==
=== Ecology and diet ===
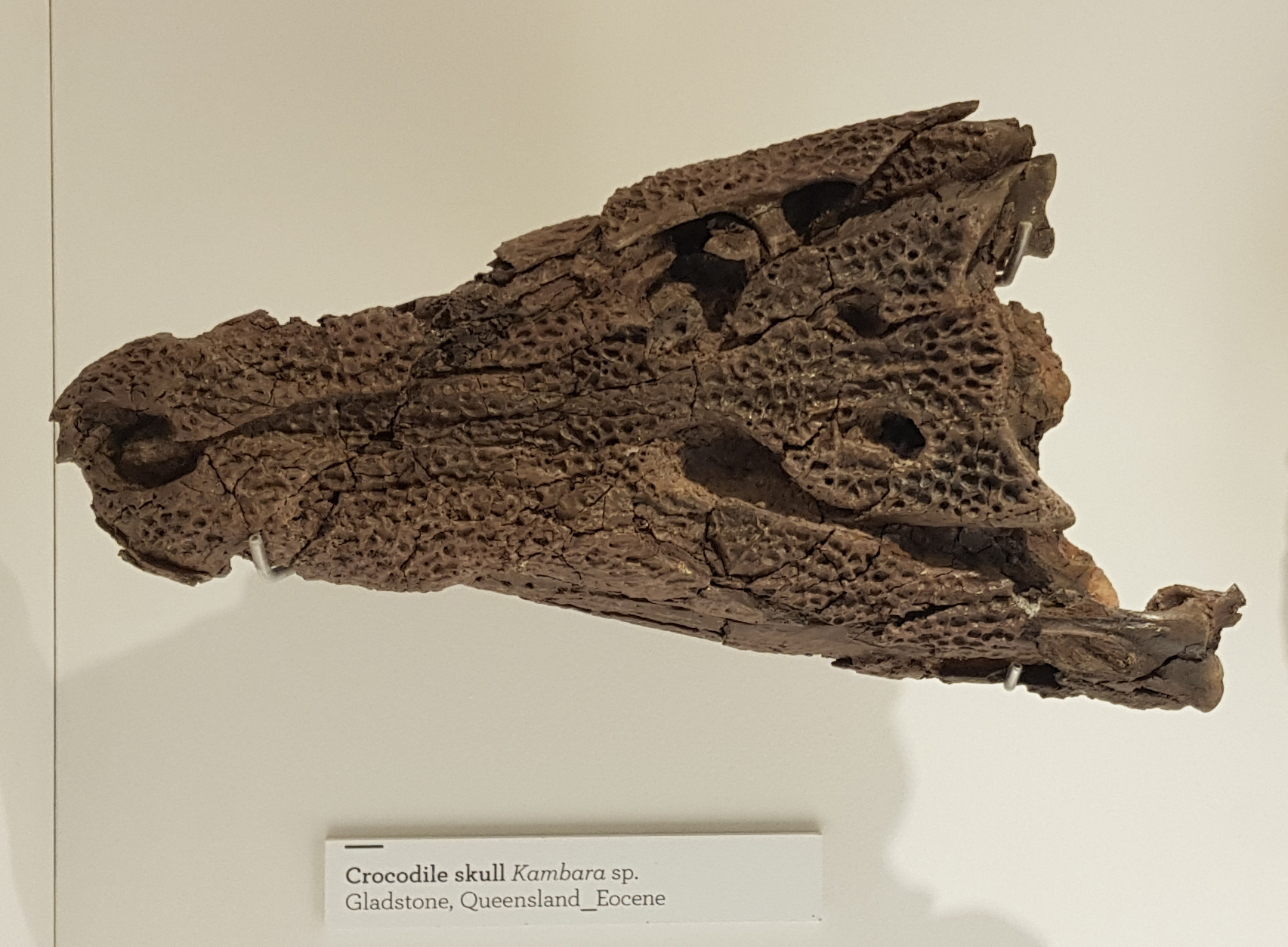
The skull of an indetermined Kambara species at the Melbourne Museum. It broadly resembles modern crocodiles.

With its appearance generally resembling today's crocodiles, in particular the flat, platyrostral snout, it is generally thought that Kambara was a semi-aquatic generalist. One method to determine the details of such a lifestyle may be found in the way the teeth of these crocodilians occlude with another, although the specifics of this are still poorly understood. One hypothesis by Charles C. Mook proposed that an overbite in crocodilians could serve a similar function as the carnassial teeth of mammalian predators, being used to break and slice. This would then suggest that interlocking dentition may be better suited when having to restrain large, struggling prey, requiring greater force that would be more evenly spread out across the toothrow.

Buchanan speculated on the potential implications for the intermediate dentition seen in Kambara molnari. Buchanan argued that the confluent tooth sockets of K. molnari and their position in the lower jaw may have increased and focused the force of the bite in a smaller area, enhancing their ability to puncture and drawing further parallels to mammalian carnassials.

Another important factor that differentiates the ecology of the various species is the development of the retroarticular process. The retroarticular process serves as an attachment site for important jaw adductor and abductor muscles and is subsequently of great importance in capturing and subduing prey. Among Kambara species, K. taraina stands out as having the most strongly developed processes, which correlates with larger pterygoid muscles and a stronger bite than that of its older relatives. This may suggest that K. taraina was capable of taking on larger, more terrestrial prey items, whereas older species fed on smaller animals. Furthermore, multiple species of Kambara show well defined attachment sites for musculature used to hold and crush prey, an activity the pterygoid would not be involved in. This collaboration between different muscle groups would allow K. taraina to attack large prey, before restraining and crushing it.

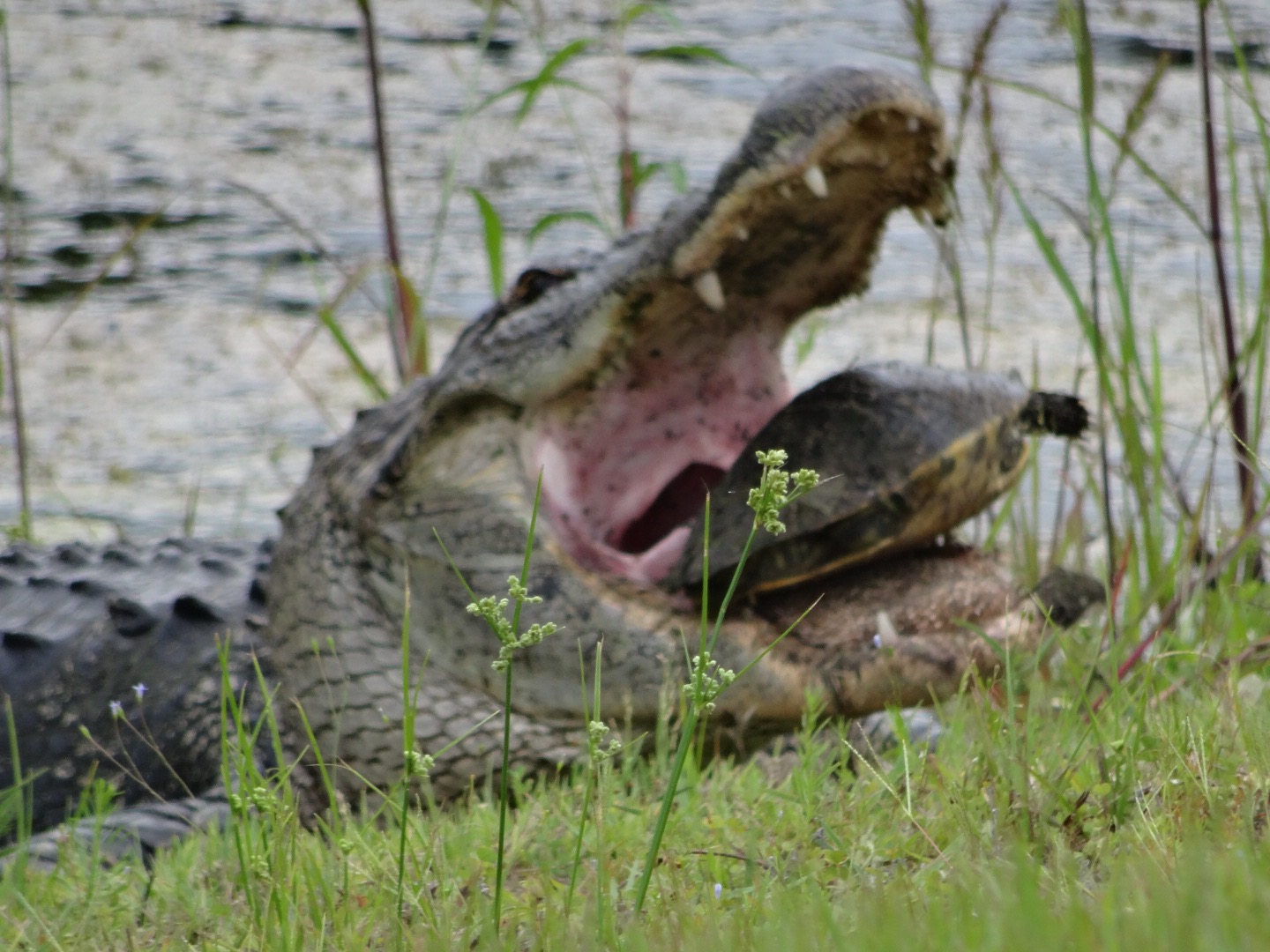
A modern Alligator "juggling" a turtle.

Direct evidence for predator prey interaction is rare for Kambara, but does exist. Specifically, Buchanan's thesis describes a chelid turtle from the same locality as Kambara taraina which appears to have been attacked by a crocodile. The fossil, a nearly complete plastron, shows several circular pits arranged in a linear fashion, which is in line with the bite marks left by a crocodilian. The amount of tooth marks present on the plastron indicates that the individual that tried to eat the turtle bit it several times, behaviour that would match the "juggling" performed by modern crocodiles. "Juggling" in this case describes the act of repeatedly biting prey like turtles in order to change its orientation, helping to align it either with the teeth or to make it easier to swallow. However, it is believed that in this instance the crocodile was overambitious, as the plastron's width and thickness would be too great for the average Kambara individual to manage. Subsequently, the turtle was let go or escaped the crocodile, allowing the bite to somewhat heal. Despite this however, the turtle later died from infection and necrosis. A costal scute of what is thought to be the same individual has also been recovered, also showing signs of a crocodile bite, some healing and infection. While this suggests that turtles, which were a readily available food source, were fed on at least occasionally, it does not necessarily mean that Kambara was specialised for hunting them.

=== Locomotion and lifestyle ===
As indicated by aspects of the skull shape, namely the resemblance to modern semi-aquatic ambush hunters, Kambara is typically regarded as such a semi-aquatic animal, which would be supported by the environment it was found in. While the skull displays no particular adaptations that would suggest any degree of terrestriality, as is the case in mekosuchines like Quinkana and Trilophosuchus, some elements of the postcranium suggest a more complex lifestyle.

Most postcranial material remains unpublished, the exception being the humerus, which is known from an undetermined species found at the Murgon locality (possibly K. implexidens). Based on the specific anatomy of the deltapectoral crest of Kambara, the upper forelimb may have been able to swing with much greater force, while also providing greater stability against gravity and thus improving the animals ability to perform the crocodilian high walk, the mode of locomotion during which crocodiles lift their body off the ground. Additionally, these factors may also increase stride-length and walking speed. The change to the deltapectoral crest could have advantages for swimming, allowing the limbs to better resist the drag during the recovery stroke. Furthermore, the shortening of the humeral shaft may have also come with advantages, although this is less clear due to the fact that no material of the lower forelimb has been described yet, making it ambiguous how the musculature of the lower and upper arm would connect. Regardless, it is possible that the shortening could have brought the musculature into a more proximal position, which would mean that the lower limbs would have exerted less force while walking or swimming, allowing the animal to swing the lower limb faster.

The range of motion for the limbs of Kambara is an additional point of consideration. The olecranon fossa and the articular surface of the humerus both suggest a wider range of motion than in saltwater and freshwater crocodiles, but especially the former would require the description of the lower arm to verify this conclusion. The increased range of motion is more certain based on the articular surface, and would suggest that Kambara would have been capable of high walking at a greater speed than the crocodiles found in Australia now. The pelvic bones of Kambara, based on material collected from Tingamarra, were described by Stein and colleagues in 2017 and feature a robust ilium similar to what is seen in modern alligators and gharials, but with notably shallower peduncles (the parts of the ilium that connect to the other bones of the hip). The joint for the femur is shallowly concave and the postacetabular process, the section of the ilium behind this joint, lacks the constriction seen in modern crocodiles. Otherwise the ilium does not differ significantly for what is seen in other Eusuchians. This morphotype is designated "pelvic form one" by Stein and colleagues and differs in its morphology from fossils found in the Rundle Formation that may pertain to another species of Kambara or possibly a different genus altogether. Assuming the former, the Rundle fossils ("pelvic form two") feature much deeper peduncles which are shared with younger mekosuchines from the Oligocene and Miocene, but lack the specific expansion of the pubic peduncle seen in later taxa. Additionally, "pelvic form two" displays a knob situated atop the postacetabular crest which appears to be convergently developed with the constriction of modern crocodylids.

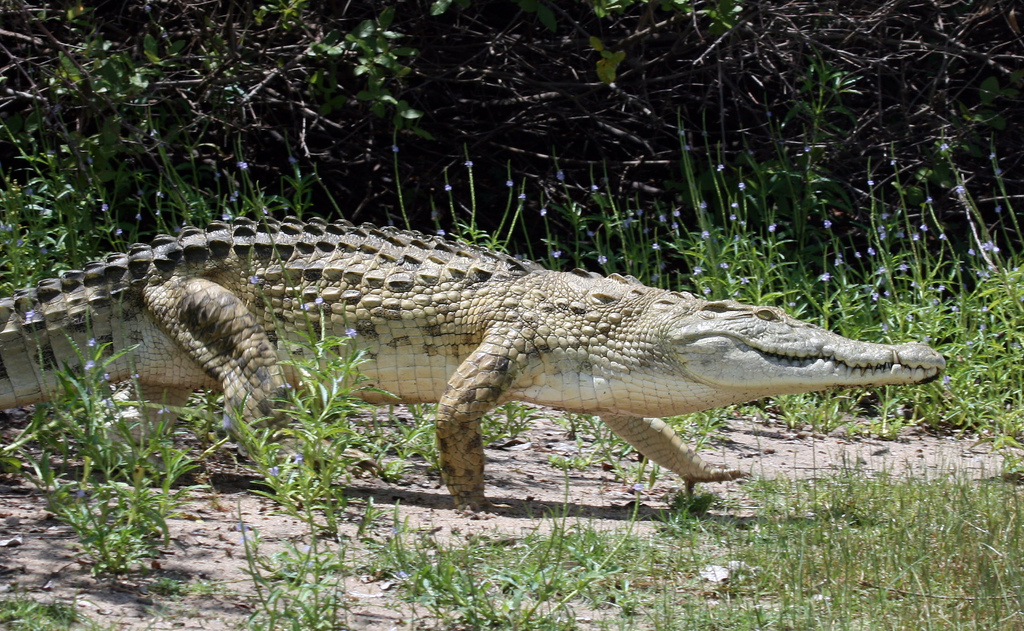
An American crocodile performing the highwalk.

Some additional discussion of other postcranial material can be found in Buchanan's PhD thesis, which also contained the later published description of Kambara taraina. Here, Buchanan notes that Kambara does indeed possess some traits associated with terrestrial locomotion, however, they are generally not as well developed as one would expect from a fully terrestrial animal. Among these is the development of the ilium and the astragalus, the later of which only differing slightly from saltwater crocodiles and with only limited mobility of the ankle. The possibility that Kambara possessed a "fibular condyle" similar to Triassic rauisuchians and aetosaurs, which would allow for hinge-like movement of the knee, is mentioned, but cannot be fully confirmed due to the poor preservation of that particular element. Simultaneously, Buchanan notes that the skeletal is not any more specialised in aquatic life than that of modern crocodilians either, suggesting a similarly generalized semi-aquatic mode of life. Finally, it is pointed out that the Kambara taraina bonebed was likely the result of mass death caused by drought, something that would be less likely to affect an animal less dependent on water.

Another discussion of the habits of Kambara can be found in a histological study published by Hoffman and colleagues in 2026. In this paper the authors note that the medulary cavity of Kambara is comparably larger than that of modern crocodilians. However, this difference is most pronounced in more derived taxa like Baru which might have been at least somewhat more terrestrial, while Kambara is still relatively similar to extant semi-aquatic crocodiles.

Overall, Kambara seemingly displays a combination of adaptions for both semi-aquatic and somewhat terrestrial life, with the limbs suggesting a superior ability to walk on land relative to modern forms, whereas the shape and form of the skull are indicative of a semi-aquatic ambush hunting lifestyle not unlike the one seen in most extant crocodilians, while certain adaptations of the arm are also advantageous for swimming. Buchanan interprets this to mean that while not being a true terrestrial crocodilian, Kambara may have been much more adapt at leaving the water than members of the genus Crocodylus. However it is also possible that this was no adaption towards movement on land, but rather used for bottom-walking in shallow waters, a habit that could have led to more terrestrial mekosuchines later during the Cenozoic.

=== Sympatry ===
One particular question that was raised in the wake of the description of Kambara implexidens was how two rather similar species of the same genus could coexist as closely as it did with Kambara murgonensis. Both species are known from a single fossil site near Murgon, with the remains being intermingled with one another, suggesting they occurred in the same environment at the time of their deaths. Morphologically, both species share a variety of similarities and differences. Both are semi-aquatic animals with platyrostral snouts and both are believed to have reached similar lengths. The two however differ in that K. implexidens was slightly more gracile both in regards to its skull and teeth in addition to the different ways the teeth occluded.

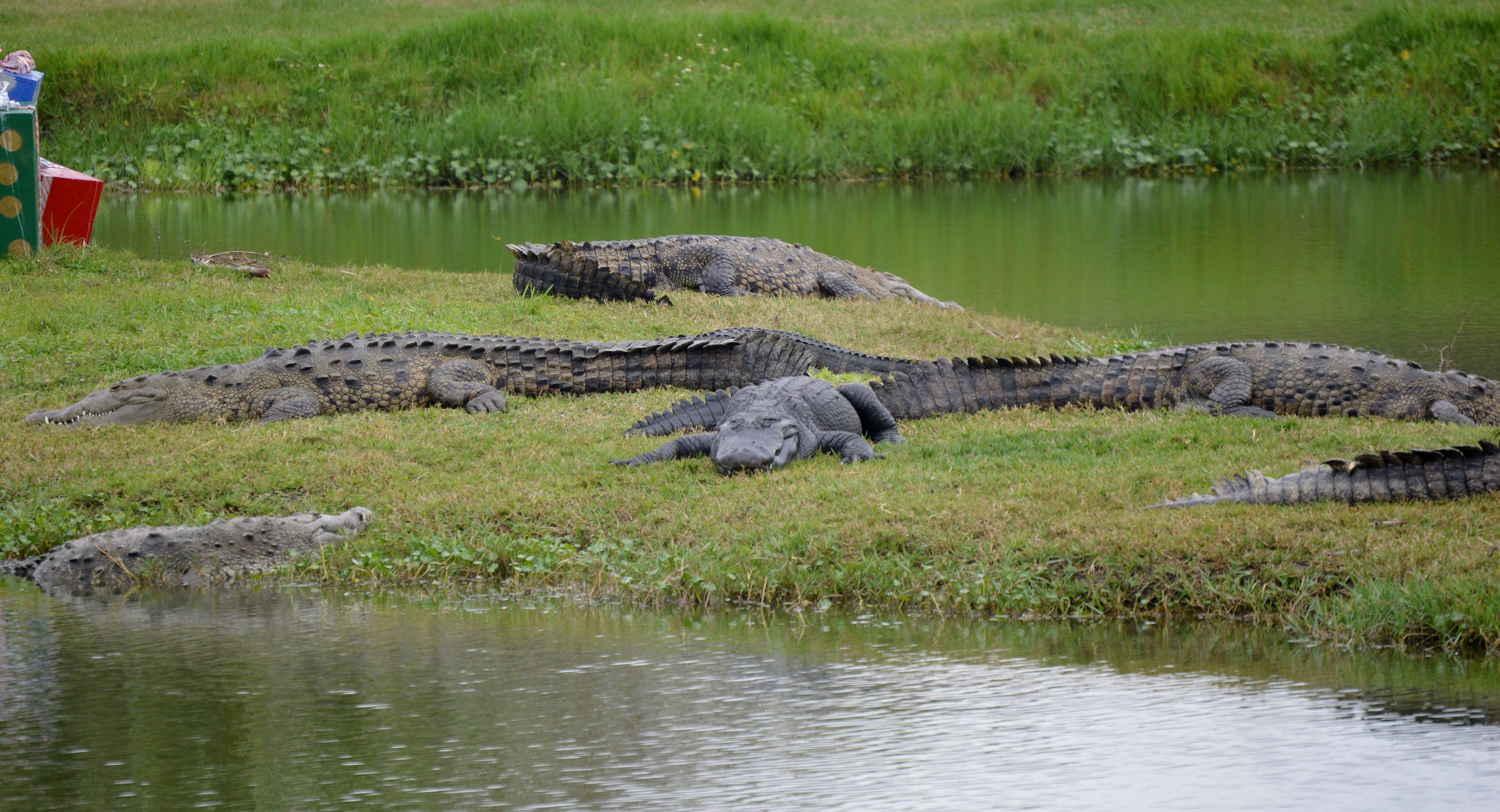
An example for modern sympatric crocodilians includes American alligators and American crocodiles.

In their 1996 description of K. implexidens, Salisbury and Willis argue that the difference in head shape was of little value to their respective ecologies. They suggest that the differences are so minor that they are effectively still the same ecomorph, which they determine may have been similar to that of today's caimans. One possible explanation may be found in taphonomy. Salisbury and Molnar suggest that, if not ecologically different, the two species may have differed in their habitat preferences and possibly wouldn't have crossed paths under normal circumstances. They point out that the fossil site near Murgon shows signs of having undergone both dry and wet periods, with the former greatly reducing the present bodies of water. A drought could have driven one of the species from their natural habitat and forced them to look for sanctuary in water that would otherwise be home to the other form. Somewhat similar circumstances may have led to the creation of the bonebed that preserves the fossils of K. taraina.

It is also possible that the animals were typically kept apart not by preferences unique to the two species but through preferences based on size, age and sex. In modern saltwater crocodiles, the ranges of nesting females and juveniles often overlap upriver or in areas of denser vegetation, whereas large, adult males prefer deeper open waters. This could explain why the Murgon site primarily preserves large individuals alongside some remains of eggs and hatchlings, with only few animals of intermediate size. Such subadults may have lived largely separate from adults in so called "stockyards", as they would pose a threat to small hatchlings while themselves being threatened by cannibalistic adult males.

=== Nesting ===
In addition to the fossil remains of large, presumably adult Kambara, the Murgon fossil site also preserves bones of hatchling-sized individuals and some fragmentary egg shells. While the eggs remains, which were described as the oospecies Wakkaoolithus godthelpi, have no direct association with Kambara specimens in the shape of fossil embryos or by being preserved directly alongside a gravid female, they nonetheless are regarded as likely having been produced by the genus for various reasons. This includes both the fact that mekosuchines are the only known crocodilians from Eocene Australia, the shere abundance of Kambara remains at Murgon and the fact that Kambara hatchlings have been recovered from the same deposits. However, it is unclear whether or not the eggs were produced by either Kambara murgonensis or Kambara implexidens or if the known material represents a mixed collection of both.

On a microstructural level the eggshells of Kambara more closely resemble those of modern alligators and caimans rather than members of the genus Crocodylus, though this is interpreted as possibly being the ancestral condition or possibly the result of convergent evolution in order to deal with similar environmental conditions. In shape the eggs are also different from those of modern crocodiles, as they are approximately as wide as they are tall while those of modern crocodiles are taller than wide.

The presence of not just adult Kambara individuals but also egg shells and hatchlings at Murgon could suggest that the site was once used by the animals to nest. The animals would have gathered around the ephemeral lake or billabong, possibly during the dry season or just before the wet season. Whether or not both Murgon species of Kambara used the site to nest at the same time is however unclear. It is possible that they were truly sympatric, that they nested at different times of the year or that the deposits were accumulated across a longer geological timespan rather than representing a snapshot in time. Whatever the case, it is considered likely that like modern crocodilians Kambara did not nest far away from the water's edge, perhaps within a radius of 100 m (330 ft).

Both modern crocodilian eggshells and those of fossil oospecies bear signs of microbial degradation acquired throughout egg incubation, which increases the porosity of the shell as the embryo develops within. However, the eggs of Kambara show no signs of such degradation, which may suggest that they were incubated in a unique matter from their modern relatives. This could possibly tie into the specific structure of their nests or even the properties of the plant material available to the animals. If not the result of different nesting habits, the absence of microbial-caused degradation could also have been the result of reduced bacterial activity, itself perhaps caused by the nest being subject to dryer conditions matching the ephemeral conditions of the local body of water. Blas and colleagues hypothesize that Kambara communities may have therefore nested during the dry season, timing the hatching of their young with the onset of the wet season. Nest humidity would have been a crucial factor in a successful incubation, either requiring specific adaptations in the eggs to deal with dryer conditions or for the parents to regulate humidity manually, possibly by using their tails to splash water onto the nest. Given the absence of degradation and the therefore lacking increase in porosity, it is possible that Kambara eggs were inherently porous enough to facilitate the required gas exchange and regulated loss of water required for the development of the embryo.

Hatchlings likely behaved similar to modern forms, initially staying in shallow water to feed on insects, crustaceans and small vertebrates while also taking shelter from would-be predators before eventually also taking to land to hunt larger prey including mammals and birds as they grow older.

=== Pathologies ===
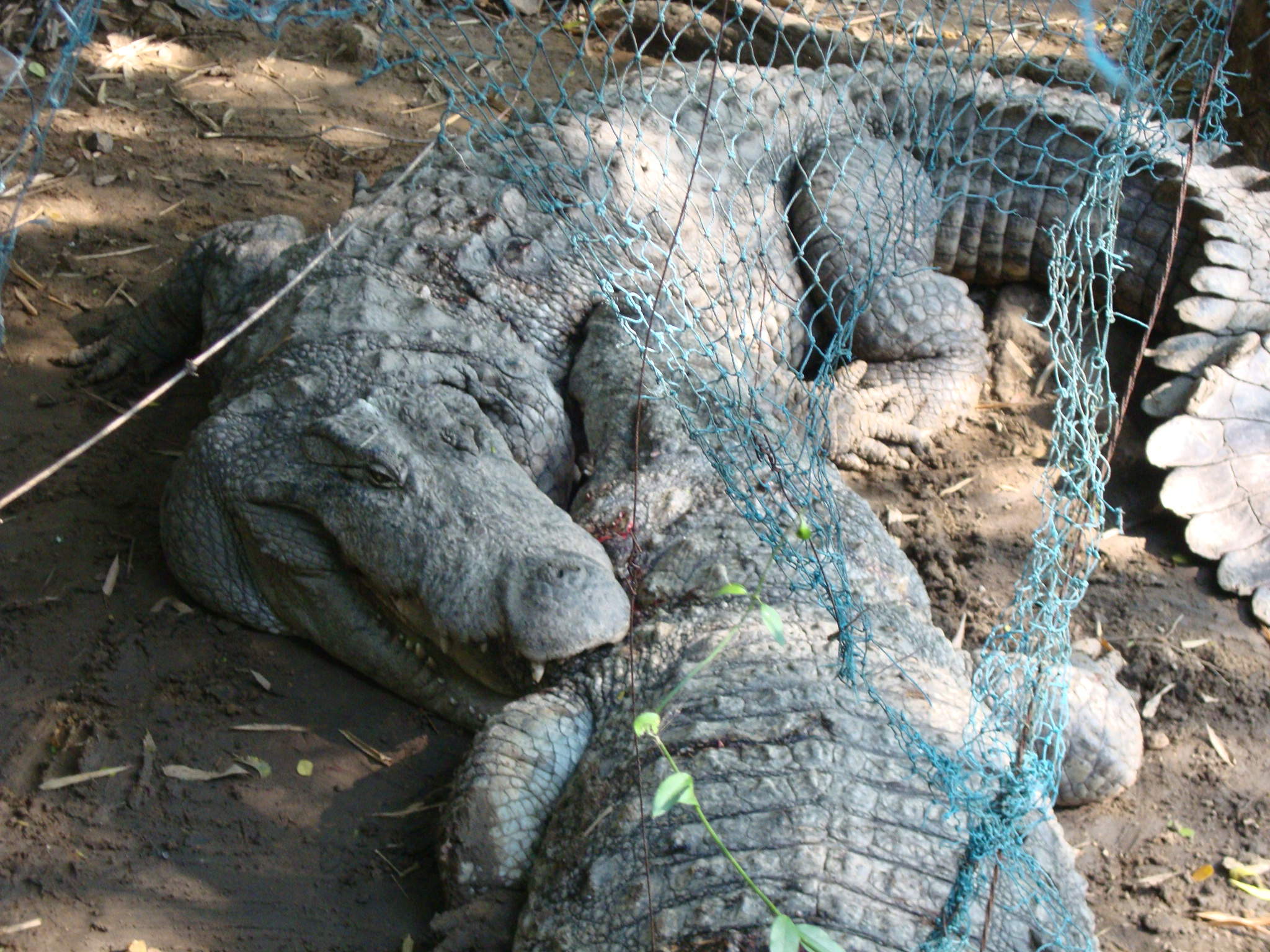
Crocodiles will often attack their opponents' limbs during intraspecific combat.

In addition to the many well preserved bones that show no signs of non-taphonomic distortion, there is plentiful material that shows clear signs of injury. This material, covered in Buchanan's thesis, includes a femur that has suffered a comminuted fracture and subsequently formed a callus, a growth of cancellous bone, during healing. Another specimen represents a series of metatarsals, toe bones, which were fractured during the animal's life and then fused into a single element as it healed, with the individual elements rotating due to the continued use of the limb. NMV P227802 on the other hand represents a heavily altered humerus, characterised by being swollen and containing numerous sinuses filled with small bone fragments, signs of osteomyelitis. Based on the advanced state of the infection, it is thought to have been chronic and to have been affecting the individual for years. The final pathological specimen noted by Buchanan is a highly deformed fibula, which in some areas is twice as wide as it should be. The reason for the extreme deformation of this particular specimen is not entirely clear, but could have been caused by one of several possible tumorous conditions.

At least some of these pathologies are explainable through intraspecific combat, meaning that individual Kambara attacked members of their own species. Such behavior is commonly seen in extant crocodilians and even recorded in a multitude of fossils. Crocodilians often attack limb bones, which would explain the fractures seen on the pathological humerus and metatarsals. The high number of individuals present at the Kambara taraina bonebed lends itself well to this hypothesis as well, with the crowded nature of the area leading to increased aggression between its residents. In both cases, the injured animal survived and healed. The osteomyelitis of NMV P227802 meanwhile was caused by a bacterial infection causing necrosis and bone death. While it is unclear how the animal was infected, it is possible that the area was exposed by an injury, possibly from the attack of another Kambara.

=== Paleoenvironment ===
Both K. murgonensis and K. implexidens were a part of the Tingamarra Fauna, which also included a variety of terrestrial and aquatic animals. Mammals are represented through various marsupials, while the reptile fauna includes softshell turtles, meiolaniid turtles and madtsoiid snakes, which inhabited a lacustrine environment. Fish are also known from this fauna, namely lungfish and teleosts, although none of them were especially large, seemingly maxing out at 100 mm (3.9 in) in length. This would suggest that the waters of this locality were rather shallow, which could indicate that it was a billabong. Furthermore, it is known that the locality was subject to cyclical wet and dry seasons.

The Rundle Formation, which was home to both K. molnari and K. taraina, on the other hand is thought to represent lagoonal mud flats. Unlike with the species of the Tingamarra Fauna, the Rundle species were not sympatric, with K. taraina stemming from the younger deposits of the Kerosene Creek Member instead of the Brick Kiln Seam.

Although so far only known from two sedimentary basins, each preserving two species, Kambara may have been much more widespread than currently known. Holt, Salisbury and Willis propose that Kambara may have been found across many of the inland waterways of Queensland, possibly even all of eastern Australia where temperatures allowed for the presence of crocodilians. If this was the case, then the distribution of Kambara may be similar to how today's freshwater crocodiles inhabit most of northern Australia.
