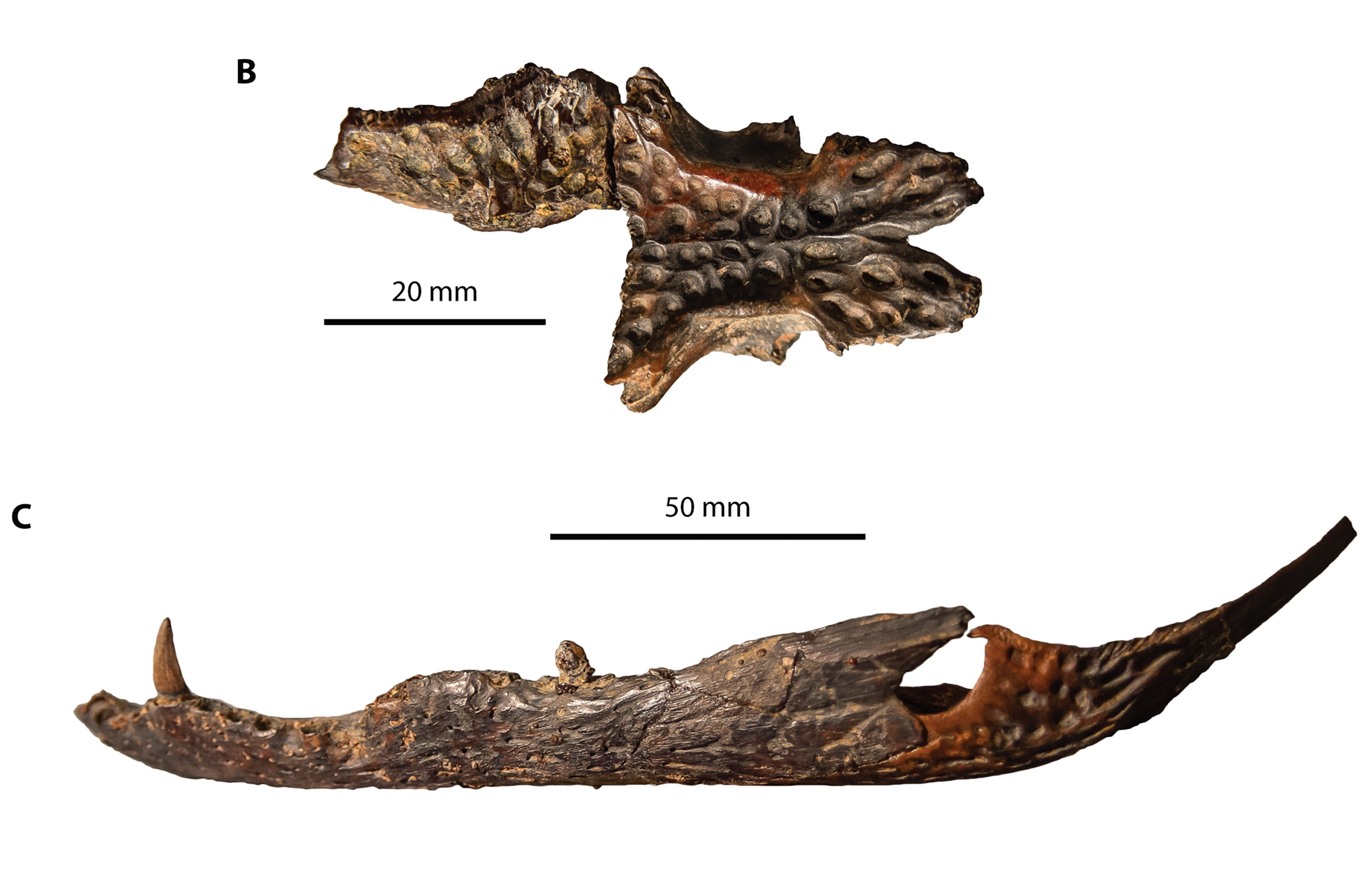

Scientific classification
- Kingdom: Animalia
- Phylum: Chordata
- Class: Reptilia
- Order: Crocodylia
- Clade: †Mekosuchinae
- Genus: †Volia; Molnar, Worthy & Willis, 2002

Type species
- †Volia athollandersoni Molnar, Worthy & Willis, 2002

= Volia =

Volia Temporal range: Pleistocene - Holocene? 0.02–0.0027 Ma

Extinct genus of reptiles

Volia is an extinct monospecific genus of mekosuchine crocodylian closely related to Mekosuchus and Trilophosuchus. Volia is known from a collection of largely fragmentary remains including skull bones and limbs recovered from the Voli Voli and Wainibuku Caves on Viti Levu (Fiji), with similar remains having been found on Naigani. It was around 2–3 metres (7–10 ft) long, making it the largest predatory animal on the island and subsequently most likely the apex predator of the Pleistocene ecosystems of Fiji. It may have fed on giant iguanas, flightless birds or even fish. Like its closest relatives, it may have been more terrestrial than today's crocodiles.

== History and naming ==
Fossils of Volia athollandersoni, the type and currently only known species, have been found in the Voli-Voli and Wainibuku Caves of Viti Levu Island. The remains were uncovered when paleontologist Trevor Worthy and archaeologist Atholl Anderson searched Viti Levu for potential fossil deposits in 1997 and 1998, specifically focusing on areas with limestone. These deposits include those of the Pleistocene Voli Voli Cave near Sigatoka River and those of Wainibuku Cave, which is of unknown age and located not far from the capital city of Suva. Both sites yielded a large number of fragmentary remains belonging both to the skull and body of the animal However, as the material is scattered and disarticulated, it is not clear how many animals were present. Based on what little material overlapped, the fossils collected appear to represent a minimum of five individuals. Additionally, due to the unknown age of the Wainibuku Cave, it is possible, if unlikely, that these remains could belong to more than one species. Molnar, Worthy and Willis argue however that this is unlikely given the relatively great size of Volia and the small size of Fiji. The holotype was recovered from the Wainibuku Cave, but the Voli Voli Cave yielded the first and largest fossils. The holotype is housed in the collection of the Museum of New Zealand Te Papa Tongarewa. Later research also discovered an additional osteoderm, tooth and a skull fragment on the island of Naigani, but due to their fragmentary nature they could not be confidently referred to Volia. However, the anatomy of the tooth favors the idea that the Naigani crocodile was Volia or another mekosuchine, rather than a modern crocodile.

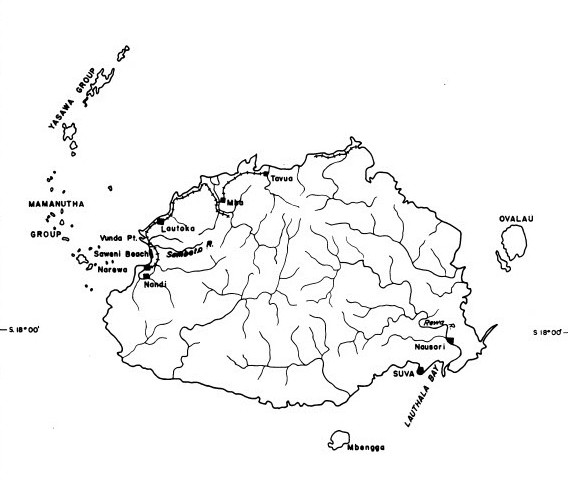
Volia is currently only known from Viti Levu Island

The name Volia is derived from the Voli Voli Cave, while the species was named after the New Zealand archaeologist Atholl Anderson.

== Description ==
Little is known of the rostrum of Volia except for a part of the premaxilla, which preserves a singular tooth socket and part of the nares, showing that they opened towards the top, not to the side like in Mekosuchus. The snout was proportionally deeper than that of today's saltwater crocodile and appears to have ended abruptly at the tip of the rostrum. The rim of the eye sockets is strongly raised by the frontal bone, which forms a prominent through between the eyes. The squamosal bone features a prominent sulcus that contributes to the supratemporal fenestrae, but lacks a specific process that is present in not only the closely related Mekosuchus and Trilophosuchus, but modern saltwater crocodiles too. One other notable feature of the squamosal is the presence of prominent foramina within the groove along the side of this element. While the purpose of said foramina is not understood, it is thought that they increased blood flow in this part of the skull, potentially for the earflaps and the associated muscles.

The lower jaw shows prominent festooning, a term used to describe the wave-like appearance of crocodile jaws. In Volia this is expressed through two prominent rises in the toothrow, topped by the fourth and tenth dentary teeth respectively. As typical in crocodiles, the fourth dentary tooth is much larger than any of those surrounding it. The tip of the lower jaw, the mandibular symphysis, is relatively low and flat, only raised slightly by the raised rim of the first dentary tooth. The external mandibular fenestra is oval and slightly inclined. The lower jaw of Volia is notably shallower than in the closely related species of the genus Mekosuchus, in which the mandible expands greatly towards the back creating a large attachment area for the mandibular adductor muscles.

The form of the teeth varies depending on their position within the jaw. These include large conical teeth that are flexed somewhat inward, with an oval crosssection at their base that grows gradually more D-shaped towards the top of the crown due to the asymmetrical cutting edges, so called carinae. A second type of large tooth crown is also present, appearing much the same but with subtle outwards curving towards the tip. These conical teeth are interpreted as being located in the front of the jaw and followed by a series of smaller teeth. Some of these are broader laterally compressed (flattened side-to-side) with carinae that possess marked ridges. While said ridges give the teeth a serrated appearance, they are not truly ziphodont like in Quinkana. Even further back in the jaw the teeth become smaller and broader still, lacking the distinct carinae and ridges of the preceding dentition.

Multiple fossils of the limbs are known, which generally resemble those of modern crocodiles. One notable exception is the ulnare, which differs greatly from those of the extant saltwater crocodile in several aspects. The articular facet that connects to the forearm is much broader than the entire bone is long and shows a different outline. The crosssection of the bone is not elliptical and the articular facet that would connect to the bones of the hand is shaped like a trochlea, not concave as in saltwater crocodiles. Especially the last of these stands out, as it puts the joints closer together and may allow for a more hinge-like joint motion, something thought to have important implications for the animals biology.

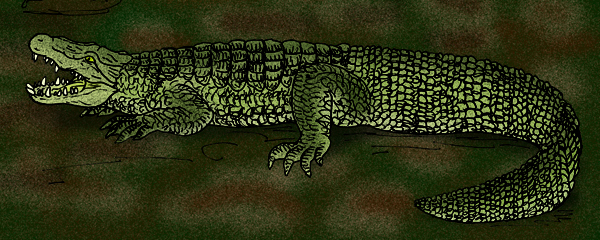
Live reconstruction of Volia atholandersoni.

The cave deposits that yielded the bones of Volia also yielded a large quantity of isolated osteoderms thought to have belonged to this genus. The 35 recovered osteoderms can generally be assigned to one of five different morphotypes. They have been compared to those of the modern spectacled caiman and saltwater crocodile, indicating that they likely formed the armor of the neck and torso. Overall, they were found to be more similar to those of the aforementioned caiman, but no exact match was found regardless. Among these osteoderms are several rectangular bones with low or no keel that are thought to have formed the dorsal armour of the torso and possess a shelf where this type overlaps with neighbouring osteoderms. These osteoderms are comparable to those of Australosuchus, with the exception that the latter lacked the shelf for articulation. A similar but smaller type of dorsal osteoderm is also known, differing in aspects such as the ornamentation. The third type is more distinct from these two, being oval in shape with a prominent keel running down its length. These are thought to have covered the neck, possibly being located just behind the occiput. The other two osteoderm types are also thought to have been placed along the neck in life and were larger than the post-occipital osteoderms, consisting of subtriangular elements and osteoderms with pronounced keels, both of which likely protruded from the side of the cervical armour.

=== Size ===
The size of Volia is not entirely understood, both due to the fragmentary nature of much of the material and the unclear age of many specimens, which may largely represent juveniles given the way the fossils disarticulated. Molnar, Worthy and Willis attempted to determine the size of one particular individual by comparing a preserved femur with the same bone in a saltwater crocodile. Assuming that the two animals shared similar proportions, this would indicate that Volia may have reached a length between 2–3 m (6 ft 7 in – 9 ft 10 in).

== Phylogeny ==
In the years leading up to the description of Volia, studies have increasingly shown that the islands of the South Pacific were in part inhabited by small crocodilians of the family Mekosuchinae. While mekosuchine research was in its early stages at the time, Molnar and colleagues note several features shared between them and Volia, tentatively suggesting that it was a close relative of Quinkana and Mekosuchus itself, with Trilophosuchus outside of this polytomy. Later studies and the description of new mekosuchine taxa gradually improved the understanding of this family, with certain relationships slowly becoming clearer. In the description of Kalthifrons by Yates and Pledge, Volia was recovered as the sister taxon to Mekosuchus, with Trilophosuchus being slightly more basal and Quinkana being part of a large polytomy due to the poor resolution of basal mekosuchines. In a 2018 tip dating study, combining morphological, molecular (DNA sequencing), and stratigraphic (fossil age) data, Lee and Yates recover slightly different results. This tree was better resolved and found Volia and Mekosuchus to be successive sister taxa to the clade formed by Trilophosuchus and Quinkana. In an even more recent publication from 2023, Volia and Mekosuchus were once again found as sister taxa and more derived than Trilophosuchus. The most significant change compared to prior analysis was that this study found that Quinkana was not part of this grouping, instead clading with Baru and Paludirex. The phylogenetic trees by Lee and Yates (2018) and Ristevski et al. (2023) are shown below.

- - Mekosuchinae
    - Australosuchus†
    - - - Kambara taraina†
        - Kambara implexidens†
      - - Kambara murgonensis†
        - - - - Kalthifrons†
              - Pallimnarchus†
            - - Baru wickeni†
              - - Baru darrowi†
                - Baru Alcoota†
          - - - Bullock Creek taxon†
              - Baru huberi†
            - - Volia†
              - - Mekosuchus†
                - - Trilophosuchus†
                  - Quinkana†
  - Longirostres

- - Crocodyloidea
    - "Crocodylus" megarhinus†
    - - Mekosuchinae
        - Kalthifrons aurivellensis†
        - - Kambara spp.†
          - - Australosuchus clarkae†
            - - - "Baru" huberi†
                - - Trilophosuchus rackhami†
                  - - Volia athollandersoni†
                    - - Mekosuchus whitehunterensis†
                      - - Mekosuchus sanderi†
                        - Mekosuchus inexpectatus†
              - - Paludirex spp.†
                - - Baru spp.†
                  - Quinkana spp.†
      - Crocodylidae

== Paleobiology ==
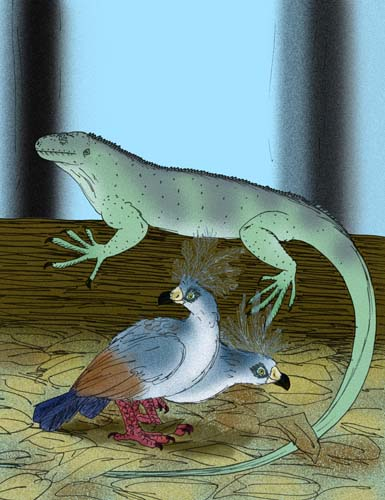
Volia may have preyed on flighless pigeons and giant iguanas.

It is possible that Volia, like the closely related Mekosuchus, was a terrestrial animal. Evidence for this may be found in the anatomy of the distal ulnare, where a more hinge-like joint motion was possible, indicating it was better adapted at moving on land relative to the modern saltwater crocodile it was compared with. This may have been an advantage on the islands of Fiji, which today lacks terrestrial predators. It is subsequently speculated that this niche could have been filled by Volia during the Pleistocene and possibly Holocene, preying on iguanas (like Lapitiguana), large birds (like Megavitiornis altirostris) or possibly fish. The pointed, slender front teeth and blunt, laterally compressed back teeth could have been used to crush the bones of birds and frogs alike. Another possibility is that the back teeth in particular were used to crush hard yet thin prey such as the shells of snails or cuticles of insects. A diet of hard-shelled invertebrates has also been suggested for Mekosuchus inexpectatus. It is possible that the adductor muscle of the jaw, responsible for closing the mouth, was less complex than in modern crocodiles. However, it is likewise possible that this is simply the result of the examined material having belonged to a juvenile animal that hadn't yet fully developed this part of its anatomy.

It is thought that Volia inhabited Fiji during the Pleistocene, perhaps 20,000 to 10,000 years ago, however it is possible that it may have been more recent. The material from Naigani, only tentatively assigned to Volia, also dates to the Holocene, having been recovered from an archaeological site that dates to around 2,900 to 2,700 years ago. Given the limited range of this animal, being endemic to these islands, they would have been especially vulnerable to changes in their ecosystem, including those caused by human settlement. The Naigani material was in fact found as oven contents at a Lapita culture site, however given these remains could also belong to a modern saltwater crocodile the role that humans might have played in the extinction of Volia remains uncertain.
