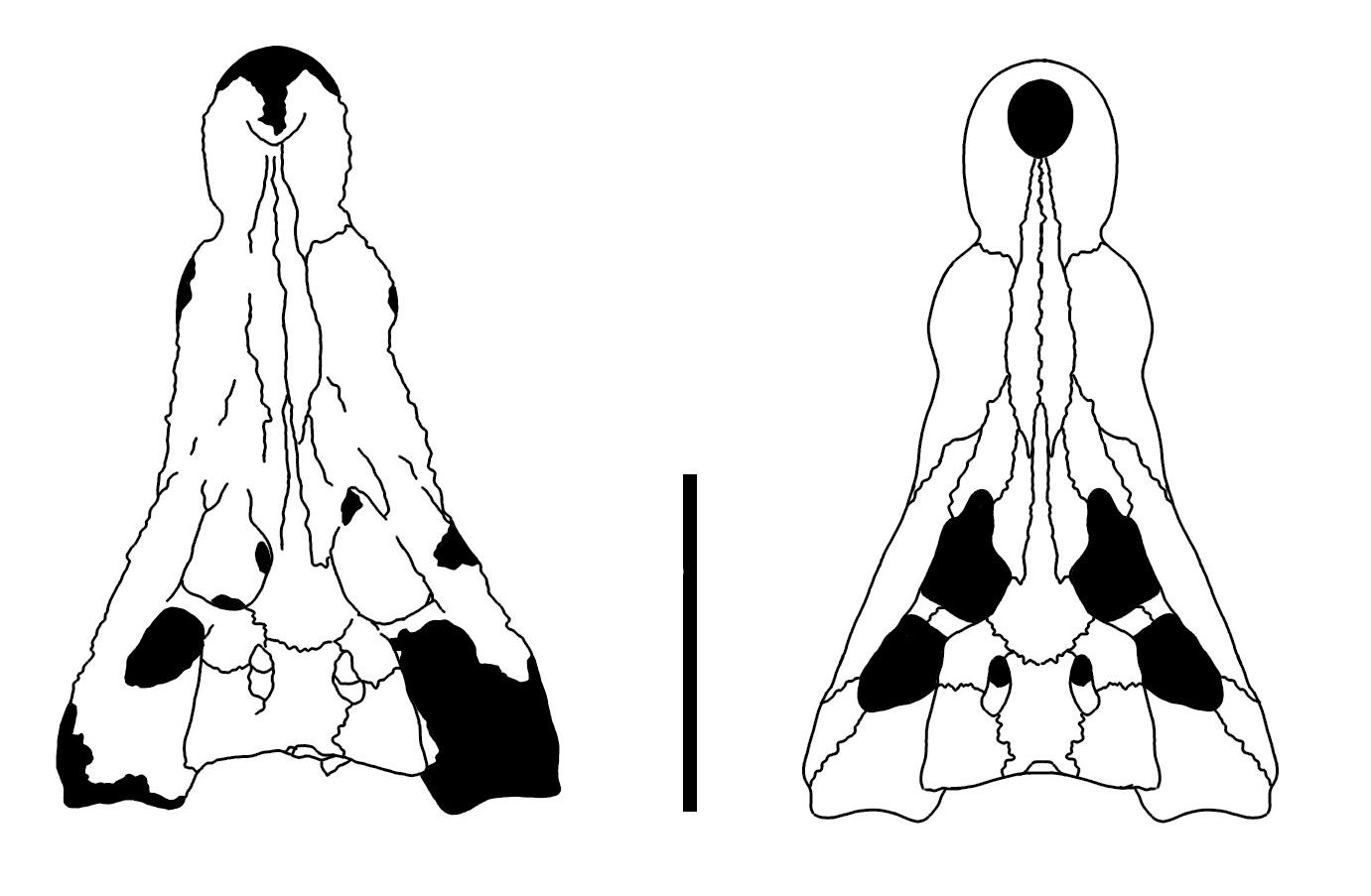

Scientific classification
- Kingdom: Animalia
- Phylum: Chordata
- Class: Reptilia
- Clade: Archosauria
- Order: Crocodilia
- Superfamily: Crocodyloidea
- Clade: †Mekosuchinae
- Genus: †Kalthifrons; Yates and Pledge, 2017

Type species
- †Kalthifrons aurivellensis Yates and Pledge, 2017

= Kalthifrons =

Kalthifrons Temporal range: Pliocene, 3.9 Ma

Extinct genus of crocodylian

Kalthifrons is an extinct monospecific genus of mekosuchine crocodylian known from the Pliocene Tirari Formation of Australia. More specifically, Kalthifrons was recovered from the Mampuwordu Sand Member, which underlies the younger sediments of the Pompapillina Member. This is significant, as the latter preserves some of the earliest records of the genus Crocodylus in Australia, which would eventually go on to replace mekosuchines. It is currently unclear whether or not the Tirari Crocodylus directly outcompeted Kalthifrons or simply moved into the region after the niche was left empty by the extinction of the local mekosuchines. Should the later be the case, then Kalthifrons may have simply been the victim of global cooling and aridification. A point in favour of the competition hypothesis is that both Kalthifrons and the Tirari Crocodylus have broadly similar skull forms, with both being interpreted as generalist semi-aquatic predators much like many of today's crocodiles. Though far from large, Kalthifrons was nonetheless bigger than many other mekosuchines such as Trilophosuchus and Mekosuchus. The genus is monotypic, meaning it contains only a single species, Kalthifrons aurivellensis.

== Discovery and naming ==
The remains of Kalthifrons were discovered on the western shores of Lake Palankarinna in South Australia's Lake Eyre Basin. The holotype (specimen SAM P35062), consisting of a cranium and two mandibular rami, was recovered from the Mampuwordu Sand Member of the Pliocene Tirari Formation. The fossil was discovered upside down, causing the area of the palate to be exposed to the elements and thus damaging it significantly. On top of this weathering of the surface, the fossil underwent significant compression during preservation, causing it to appear much flatter than it would have in life. The Golden Fleece Locality, where the fossils were discovered, also yielded a variety of isolated remains, mostly consisting of teeth, osteoderms and vertebrae. While the lack of overlap means that none can be definitely proven to have been those of Kalthifrons, the fact that the locality is thought to have been a mass death site has been used to argue that they likely represent a single species. As a result of this, the material was tentatively referred to Kalthifrons.

The generic name derives from the Dieri word for "spear" (kalthi) and frons, meaning forehead, a name chosen in reference to the animal's elongated frontal process. The species epithet is a combination of the Latin "aurum" for gold and "vellus" meaning fleece, chosen to reflect the locality where the fossil has been discovered.

== Description ==
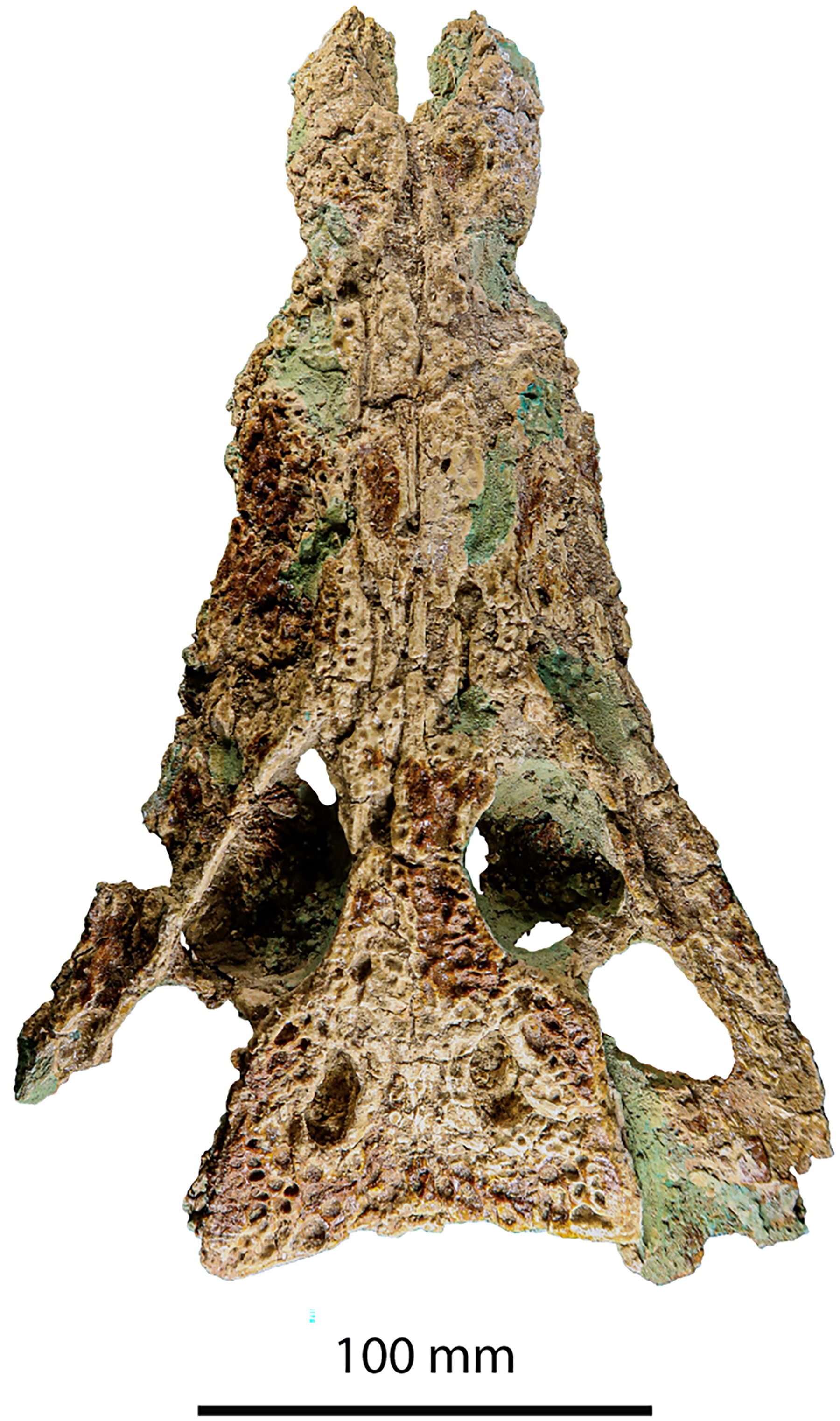
Holotype skull of Kalthifrons

Kalthifrons possessed a relatively short and roughly triangular skull that broadly resembles that of today's crocodiles, indicating that it was a generalist predator. Additionally, the snout is described as platyrostral, effectively meaning that it was flattened. However, the precise degree to which this applies is difficult to determine as the holotype skull was badly crushed during preservation, greatly exaggerating its form in profile view. Adam Yates and Neville Pledge speculate that the skull of Kalthifrons may have been moderately deep, making it similar to that of Baru, given that the former preserves a distinct swelling above the fifth maxillary tooth that would be absent in an animal with a very deep (altirostral) skull similar to Quinkana.

The tip of the snout appears to have been differently proportioned in Kalthifrons when compared to other mekosuchines. The premaxillae are narrow and the external nares are longer than they are wide, contrasting with those of its closest relatives. The nares themselves are almost entirely surrounded by the premaxillae, save for a small section where the nasal bones contribute. The region where the premaxilla transitions to the maxilla is marked by a prominent notch where the jaw is constricted to make space for the fourth tooth of the lower jaw, something commonly seen in crocodilians. While this condition can be observed in a variety of mekosuchines, it does help distinguish Kalthifrons from Australosuchus, as in the latter the fourth dentary tooth slides into a nearly enclosed hole in the bone rather than an open notch. Behind this notch, the maxillae swell laterally, forming a boss around the location where the fifth maxillary tooth would sit. The eyesockets, also known as orbits, are located comparably far towards the front to the skull, at least relative to other crocodilians. This condition is similar to that found in Baru darrowi, and is present due to the fact that the front of the orbits forms a narrow point that extends up until the eleventh tooth of the maxilla. The orbits are also noted for being large, with their individual diameters being much greater than the distance between them. Overall the orbits have an uneven shape, with the anterior segment being pointed, while the main part of the orbits is more circular in shape. This shape is partially caused by how the prefrontals contribute to the orbital margin, as these bones form prominent flanges that extend into the orbits. The lacrimal bones, which are situated before the prefrontals, are elongated and irregularly triangular in shape. Thick ridges extend from the lacrimal's contribution to the orbits until the pointed tip of the bones. These ridges are the result of a distinct change in slope, unlike in the Saltwater Crocodile, which has preorbital ridges raised above the rest of the skull. In general, the ridges seen on Kalthifrons resemble those of Baru wickeni.

The most characteristic feature of Kalthifrons, and the one it was named for, is its frontal bone. As is typical for crocodilians, the frontal is divided into two segments, the posterior one of them is broad and makes up the space between the eyesockets and part of the skull table. The anterior process meanwhile is generally long and slender, however, in Kalthifrons this is taken to an extreme as the anterior process extends much further down the rostrum as is typical, accounting for about 64% of the frontal's entire length. Additionally, the space between the eyes is much wider than in Australosuchus, owing to the greater width of the posterior section of the frontal.

The skull table is flat and trapezoid in shape with elliptical supratemporal fenestrae similar to those found in Trilophosuchus. The fenestrae are widely spaced, much wider than each fenestra is long, with the interfenestral bar being formed entirely by the parietal. The massive distance between the fenestrae is unusual for mekosuchines and only one other species is noted for having similar proportions, that being an unspecified species of Baru from the Alcoota fossil site. Though small, the fenestrae are largely unobscured by the surrounding bones overhanging it, with only the parietal slightly overhanging the rear-most corner of the fenestrae. The supraoccipital, though exposed on the dorsal surface like in the majority of mekosuchines, is narrow, and only makes up a small part of the skull table. The supraoccipital is described as semilunate in shape, whereas it is triangular in most other mekosuchines.

Since the mandibular remains found alongside the holotype skull are poorly preserved, little information could be gathered from them. The most notable aspect of the mandible is that the flat underside is offset from the side by a nearly 90° bend. This is most similar to mandibles that have been referred to Quinkana.

Only a handful of postcranial remains have been found, including vertebrae that provide no further valuable information. Some osteoderms are also known from the Golden Fleece locality, though it is unsure if they belonged to Kalthifrons. They range in shape from square to rectangular, with keels that range from being low to tall. As in other crocodilians, they are ornamented with a series of pits, save for the region where the osteoderms overlap with one another.

=== Dentition ===
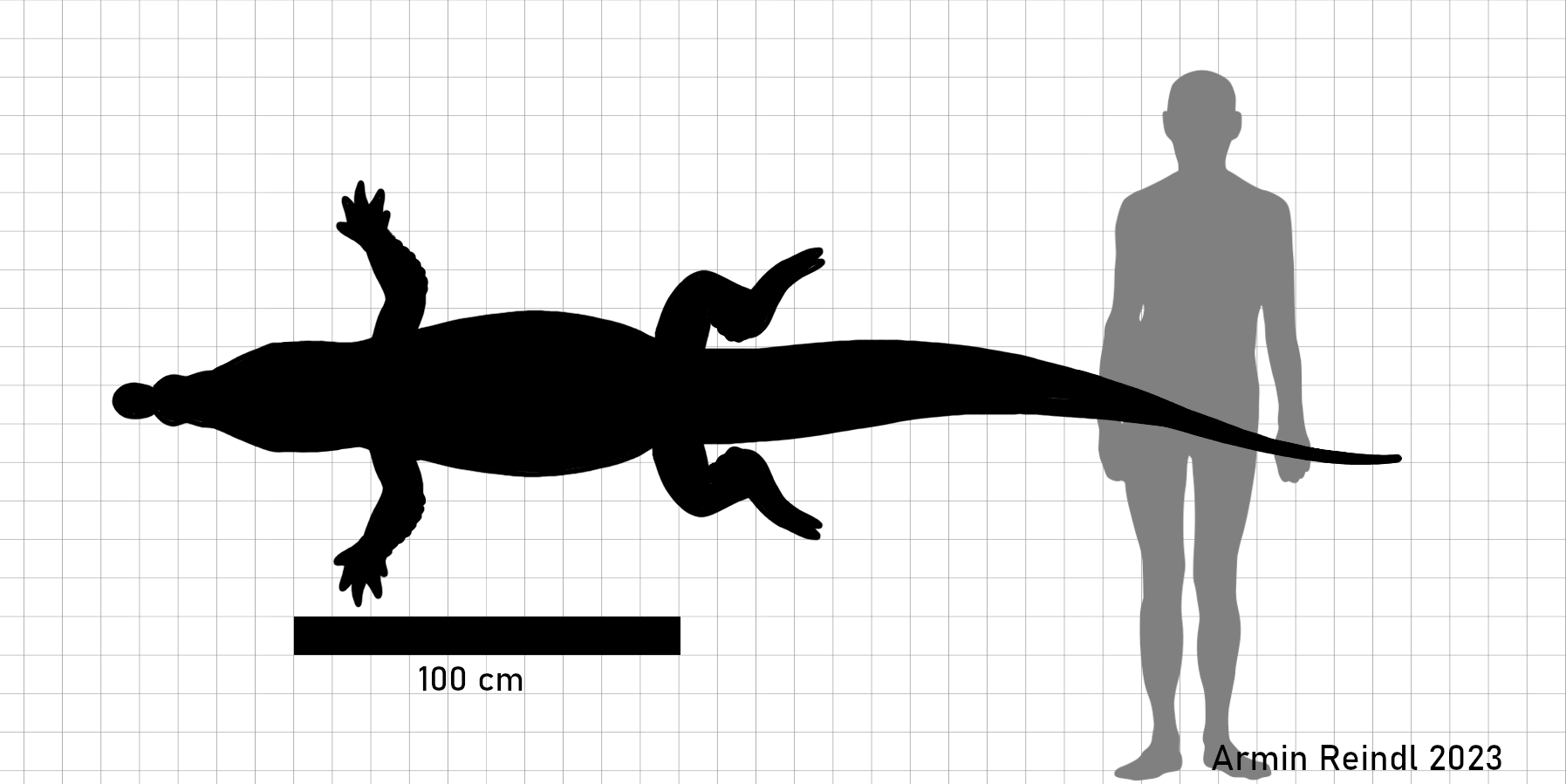
Size comparison of Kalthifrons

Given the extensive damage that the underside of the holotype of Kalthifrons suffered, the exact number of teeth is difficult to determine. Three teeth were preserved in the left premaxilla, with the missing portion before them indicating more were present. However, it remains uncertain whether this region housed one or two teeth, meaning the number of premaxillary teeth could be either four or five. The case of the maxillary teeth is similar, with one side preserving 10 tooth positions with space for more and the other indicating a minimum of 11 teeth. The true number of maxillary teeth was likely higher, but erosion makes it impossible to determine this fact until better material is found. The teeth towards the front of the maxilla are closely spaced, which may suggest that there was too little space for the teeth of the upper and lower jaw to interlock. Again, this may change with the discovery of better material, as the type specimen does not preserve the bone that would be situated between the individual teeth. Regardless of the state of the early maxillary teeth, some degree of interlocking was present in Kalthifrons based on the presence of a large reception pit located between the sixth and seventh teeth.

Even less is known about the tooth crowns, of which only three are known. All were part of the posterior teeth of their respective sections and, accordingly, are short, blunt and broadly rounded. The teeth are compressed side to side and have smooth cutting surfaces. However, there are some better preserved teeth that were collected from the same locality as the holotype. While referral of these teeth remains tentative, Yates and Pledge argue that the nature of the Golden Fleece locality, having been a dried up pool of low-diversity, makes it very likely that they too belonged to Kalthifrons. These teeth correspond well to more anterior dentition, being taller and more pointed, but less compressed, with a gentle inward curvature.

=== Size ===
The preserved portions of the skull of Kalthifrons measure around 44.7 cm (17.6 in) long from the broken snout tip to the remains of the quadrate bone. While this is far from the size of larger mekosuchines like Baru and Paludirex, Kalthifrons still exceeded the total body length of "dwarf forms" such as Volia, Trilophosuchus and Mekosuchus.

== Phylogeny ==
Early research on Kalthifrons struggled with its relationship to other mekosuchines, though Yates and Pledge ruled out the possibility that Kalthifrons could belong to any other clade of crocodilian, making a position as a mekosuchine the most probable scenario. In their analysis, Kalthifrons' position varied greatly between trees, with its uncertain nature creating a large polytomy at the base of the group that contains Mekosuchinae minus Australosuchus (which was recovered as a sister taxon to all other taxa). The different positions occupied by Kalthifrons in their results varied between it being a very basal animal outside of the clade formed by Kambara and all other mekosuchines to it being a derived member of Mekosuchini, the clade containing Quinkana, Baru and the dwarf forms. Its shifting position was explained as being the result of the poor preservation, subsequently limited number of usable characters and the incongruent results these characters yielded.

However, later studies did recover better resolved trees that somewhat clarified the position of this animal within the family. Lee and Yates (2018) recovered Kalthifrons as a close relative of Pallimnarchus and Baru, two other mekosuchines that exhibit a more typical crocodilian morphology. An even more recent paper by Ristevski and colleagues from 2023 proposes a different placement. In their results, Kalthifrons typically occupies a very basal position within Mekosuchinae alongside Australosuchus and Kambara, akin to some of the results found by Yates and Pledge. More specifically, one of their results suggested that Kalthifrons may have been the basalmost member of the group, whereas another saw Kalthifrons share this placement with Kambara.

- - Mekosuchinae
    - Australosuchus†
    - - - Kambara taraina†
        - Kambara implexidens†
      - - Kambara murgonensis†
        - - - - Kalthifrons†
              - Pallimnarchus†
            - - Baru wickeni†
              - - Baru darrowi†
                - Baru Alcoota†
          - - - Bullock Creek taxon†
              - "Baru" huberi†
            - - Volia†
              - - Mekosuchus†
                - - Trilophosuchus†
                  - Quinkana†
  - Longirostres

- - Crocodyloidea
    - "Crocodylus" megarhinus†
    - - Mekosuchinae
        - Kalthifrons aurivellensis†
        - - - Kambara spp.†
          - - Australosuchus clarkae†
            - - - "Baru" huberi†
                - - Trilophosuchus rackhami†
                  - - Volia athollandersoni†
                    - - Mekosuchus whitehunterensis†
                      - - Mekosuchus sanderi†
                        - Mekosuchus inexpectatus†
              - - Paludirex spp.†
                - - Baru spp.†
                  - Quinkana spp.†
      - Crocodylidae

== Paleobiology ==
Based on its platyrostral, short and triangular skull, Kalthifrons was most likely a semi-aquatic generalist predator living in the waterways of what is now South Australia, sharing its habitat with turtles such as Elseya sp. (cf. E. lavarockorum). The Golden Fleece Locality where Kalthifrons was discovered is interpreted to have been a watering hole at the time the crocodilian was alive. The scattered and disassociated remains of turtles and crocodiles alike have been interpreted as a single mass death assemblage that may have been formed when the water dried up, leaving its aquatic inhabitants to die. This hypothesis is supported by the presence of a thin layer of selenite underlying the sand.

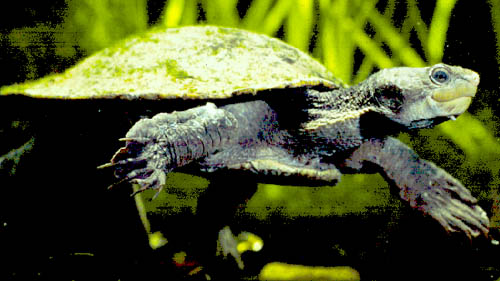
The gulf snapping turtle may have appeared alongside Kalthifrons.

A variety of crocodilian remains have been collected from the region that yielded the fossils of Kalthifrons, with the closest geographically being the many isolated teeth and osteoderms that make up a part of the mass death assemblage of the Golden Fleece Locality. Although the fact that they were found in isolation means that they cannot be confidently assigned to the genus, Yates and Pledge nonetheless argue that they are likely to represent Kalthifrons due to the nature of the site. More anomalous is the discovery of remains of Australosuchus from other localities within the Mampuwordu Sand Member, which would indicate that this genus survived for an unusually long time. However, today it is generally accepted that these fossils were either reported with faulty provenance or were simply reworked from older layers. Even beyond the scenario that Australosuchus fossils were wrongfully attributed to the same units as Kalthifrons, Yates and Pledge argue that their overall similar generalist nature means that they would have been unlikely to coexist. The final crocodilian known from the Mampuwordu Sand Member is Quinkana, which has been identified based on a maxillary fragment discovered in the Woodard Quarry. Though initially identified as a sebecosuchian, later research has shown that the tall snout and ziphodont teeth are indistinguishable from those of Quinkana and clearly distinct from those of Kalthifrons. Unlike with Australosuchus, Quinkana would have clearly occupied a different ecological niche within the Pliocene Lake Eyre Basin and would thus not have been in competition with the semi-aquatic Kalthifrons.

Much younger sediments of the Tirari Formation, specifically those of the Pompapillina Member, lack remains referable to Kalthifrons, but do preserve what is generally thought to have been a generalist species of the genus Crocodylus. Based on the dating of this member, the genus entered the Lake Eyre Basin during the middle Pliocene (3.9–3.4 mya), possibly overlapping with the range of Kalthifrons. The appearance of Crocodylus in Australia, likely arriving after having migrated there via the Malay Archipelago, would have come at a crucial point in the history of mekosuchines. Though highly successful during the Oligocene and Miocene, the group appears to have experienced a major faunal turnover leading into the Pliocene, with much of the Miocene diversity going extinct after what was likely a brief period of especially intense aridity. While mekosuchines managed to bounce back after conditions briefly became wetter again, the case of the Tirari Crocodylus represents the first sign of crocodylines replacing mekosuchines in the long run. While this shift is undeniable, the precise reason for the change remains unknown. While it is possible that competition between the two was a factor, given their similar generalist morphology, there is no direct evidence that Crocodylus drove Kalthifrons to extinction by outcompeting it. This is further complicated by the fact that Paludirex, another generalist, inhabited Australia until the late Pleistocene, though it is unclear whether or not this genus coexisted with Crocodylus. A second hypothesis is that Kalthifrons and mekosuchines in general proceeded to suffer from the ongoing aridification that continued onward throughout the later part of the Neogene and Quaternary. This would suggest that while the group managed to survive the early stages of this change in climate during the Miocene, they failed to adapt to the changing conditions. Following this line of thought, Kalthifrons could have disappeared before Crocodylus entered the Lake Eyre Basin, with the latter simply moving into the newly opened niche.
