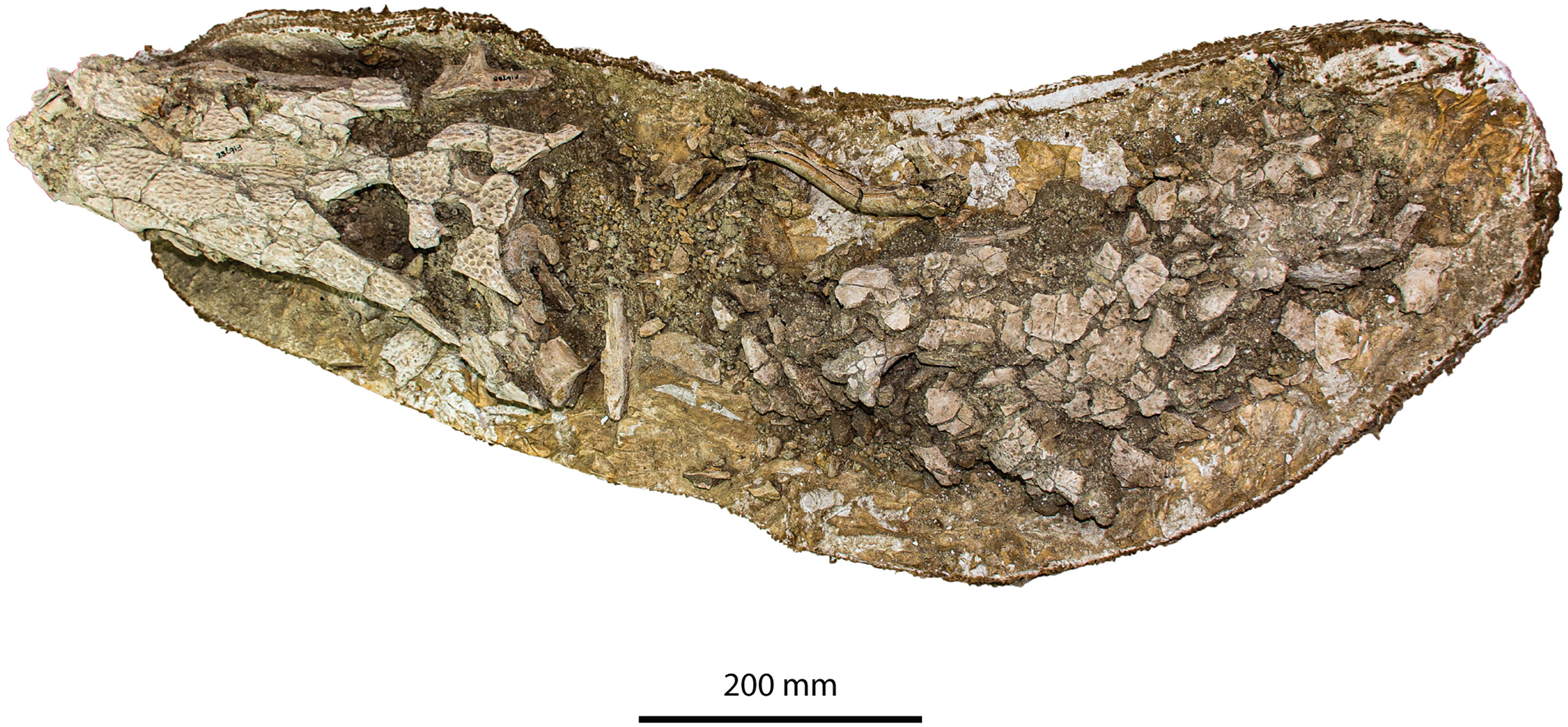

Scientific classification
- Kingdom: Animalia
- Phylum: Chordata
- Class: Reptilia
- Clade: Archosauria
- Order: Crocodilia
- Superfamily: Crocodyloidea
- Clade: †Mekosuchinae
- Genus: †Australosuchus; Willis & Molnar, 1991

Type species
- †Australosuchus clarkae Willis & Molnar, 1991

= Australosuchus =

Australosuchus Temporal range: Late Oligocene–Early Miocene, 28.1–16 Ma

Genus of reptiles

Australosuchus is an extinct monospecific genus of crocodylian belonging to the subfamily Mekosuchinae. The type and only known species Australosuchus clarkae lived during the Late Oligocene and the Early Miocene in the Lake Eyre Basin of South Australia. It was described in 1991 by Paul Willis and Ralph Molnar from fossil material discovered at Lake Palankarinna.

Australosuchus is among the mekosuchines with the southernmost distribution, being found exclusively at a latitude below 27°S, which is the basis for its scientific name meaning "southern crocodile". This range is peculiar, as no material of this species is known from any of the more northern localities, which are known from their highly diverse crocodilian fauna. Likewise, although crocodilian remains are common in the southern localities too, they seem to exclusively belong to Australosuchus, not featuring any of the taxa present in areas such as the Riversleigh World Heritage Area. One explanation suggests that Australosuchus was especially cold-resistant compared to contemporary forms like Baru and was thus able to inhabit freshwater systems too cold for its relatives.

== History and naming ==
One of the earliest discovered mekosuchines, Australosuchus was named in 1991 shortly after the publication of Baru. This makes it only the fourth mekosuchine to have been formally described and one of the species that first lead to the recognition of an endemic Australian Cenozoic group of crocodilians. Like many other mekosuchines, remains of this genus had been known long before its formal description, with the fossils of Australosuchus having been mentioned in literature as far back as 1968. The holotype of Australosuchus is specimen QM F16788, a partial skeleton collected in 1975 that includes a nearly complete skull and lower jaw, various vertebrae, parts of the forelimbs and the dorsal armor. The holotype was unearthed from the Etadunna Formation near Lake Palankarinna, South Australia. In addition to a vast quantity of additional fossils from the Late Oligocene to Miocene Etadunna Formation, there is also fossil material from the Namba Formation near Lake Pinpa and Lake Tarkarooloo as well as the Wipijiri Formation near Lake Ngapakaldi. Some fossils were initially described as stemming from the Mampuwordu Sands, which has been interpreted to be Late Pliocene to Early Pleistocene in age, but this is generally deemed unlikely. Instead, it has been proposed that the fossils were reworked from the underlying strata of the Etadunna Formation.

The name of Australosuchus derives from the Latin "australis" and the Greek "suchus", which in combination mean "southern crocodile". The species name on the other hand honors Elaine Clark, a dedicated supporter of the Riversleigh Research Project.

== Description ==
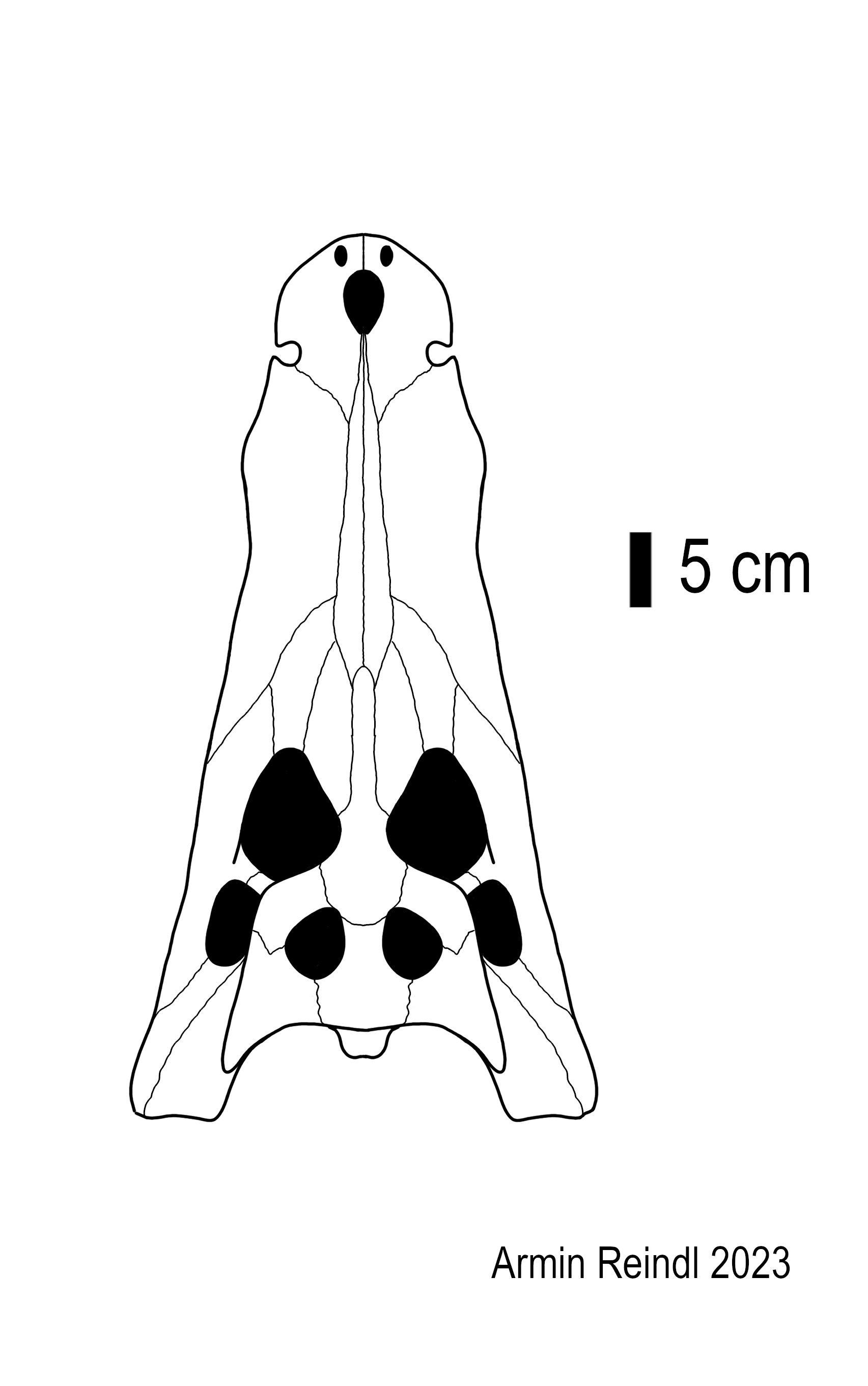
Reconstructed skull of Australosuchus

Australosuchus was a medium-sized crocodilian with a moderately broad and flattened skull.

The nares were circular to ovate depending on the specimen and slightly raised. Each premaxilla contained five teeth while also showing pits that in life would have accommodated the teeth of the lower jaw. These pits are located either slightly inward from the upper teeth or between them. The first pit in particular is placed directly between the first and second pair of teeth in the upper jaw, interlocking with them. In some specimens of Australosuchus these teeth pierce through the upper surface of the skull, meaning that the reception pits are also visible in top view in these specimens. The contact between the premaxilla and maxilla also coincides with the position of the enlarged fourth dentary tooth of the lower jaw. Like in many crocodilians, the maxilla is formed specifically to accommodate for this tooth. However, while in most genera this is achieved through a marked constriction in the form of the rostrum, in Australosuchus the dentary teeth slide into a semi-enclosed pit. This renders the fourth dentary less visible when the jaws were closed, which in turn gives Australosuchus an appearance more similar to alligators than to crocodiles. The maxillae are moderately broad and flat, containing 14 teeth on each side, the first six of which are placed along an alveolar process. The dentition of the upper jaw is described as pseudoheterodont, the teeth feature prominent, but unserrated, cutting edges and the tooth sockets are rounded in the front of the snout before becoming more ovate further back. The pattern of tooth size is typically crocodilian, with the largest maxillary tooth being the fifth, after which the teeth grow smaller before another, much less developed increase in size leading up to the tenth. Like in the premaxillae, the reception pits for most dentary teeth are located between and slightly inward to the upper toothrow. This effectively excludes them from the outer margin and indicates that while the teeth interlocked, they did not do so fully.

The nasals are only poorly preserved, but fossil evidence suggests that they extended into the margins of the external nares. The jugals are slender and the quadratojugals broad and thickened. The lacrimal bones are long and slender and form the anterior most tip of the eye sockets. The prefrontals connect directly from the lacrimal and form a W-shaped suture together with the nasals and the anterior process of the frontal bone. The frontal, as in other crocodilians, can be divided into an anterior and posterior region. The anterior process is especially long and slender in Australosuchus and extends in-between the two nasal bones, while the posterior region is robust and concave due to the raised eye sockets. The skull table is trapezoid, with large circular supratemporal fenestrae.

Like those of the upper jaw, the teeth of the lower jaw are pseudoheterodont and arranged alongside an alveolar process that extends as far back as the 14th tooth. However both these features may be age-dependant and appear less pronounced in younger individuals. The lower jaw contains between 16 and 17 teeth depending on the specimen, the size of which follows the pattern typical for crocodilian. This means that the largest teeth of the lower jaw are the first and fourth respectively. The mandibular symphysis, the region formed where the two dentaries meet, extends back until the fourth or fifth dentary tooth depending on the specimen. The symphysis is rather broad, broader than in similarly sized saltwater crocodiles, and notably upswept. The tooth sockets in the front of the jaw are more rounded in cross section whereas those in the back of the jaw are ovate. A few lower jaw tooth crowns are preserved, including a crown of the first tooth pair, which is slender and recurved with mesial and distal cutting edges. The second to fifth crowns share those cutting edges and appear to be laterally compressed. Tooth crowns further back (represented by the eleventh) retain the carinae and compression, but are blunter than the anterior teeth.

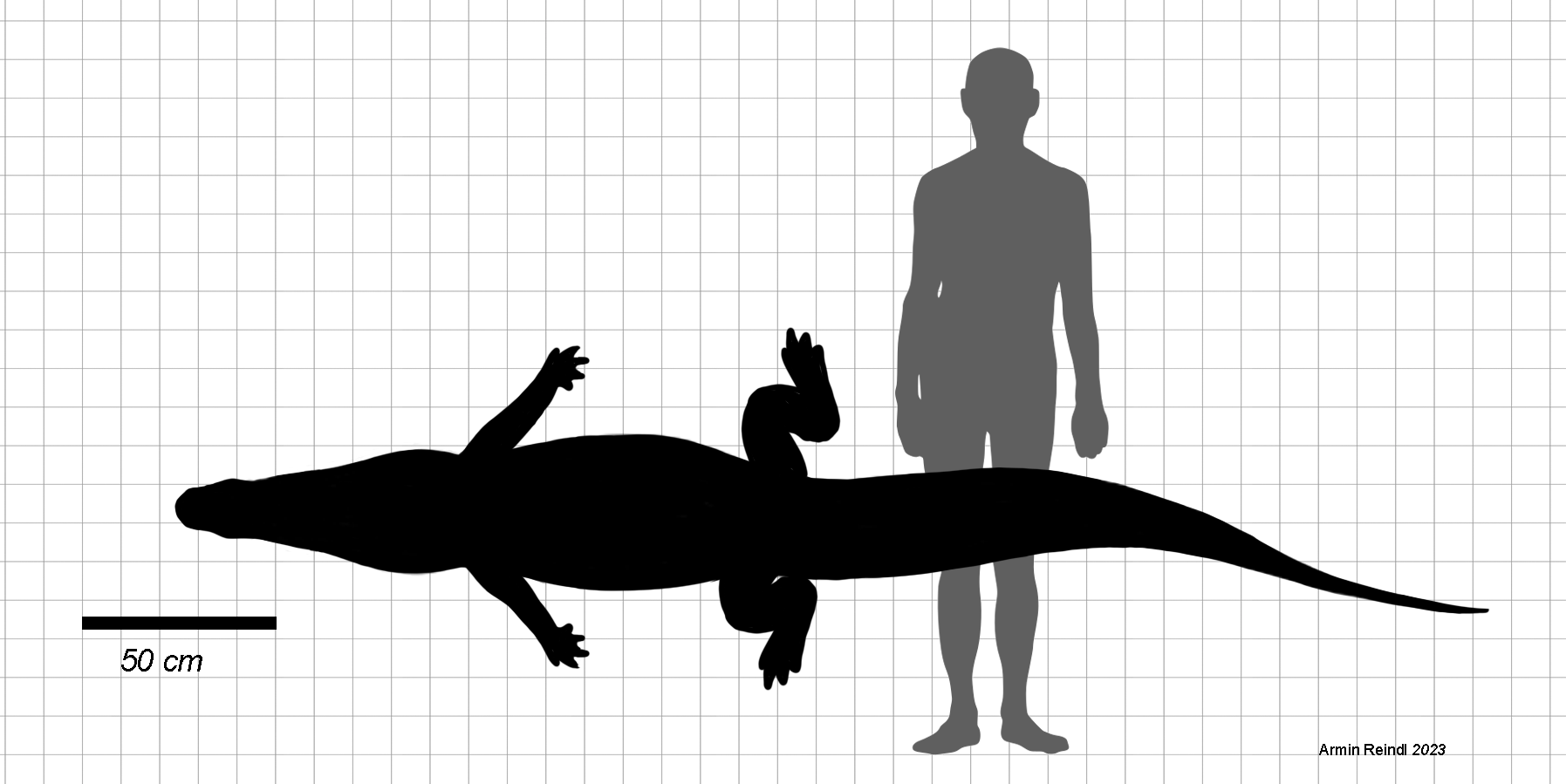
Size comparison of the largest described Australosuchus.

While many specimens show postcranial material, it is typically not well preserved nor described in detail. Generally, it is described as being similar to what is seen in modern crocodilians found in Australia. The vestigial fifth toe is robuster and thicker than in other crocodilians. Australosuchus was a medium-sized crocodilian, with Willis suggesting an estimated length of around 3 m (9.8 ft).

== Phylogeny ==
Australosuchus was described during the early stages of mekosuchine research, when an endemic Australian crocodilian radiation had just been proposed and before the family was officially named. Subsequently, no phylogenetic analysis was conducted in the original description of the genus, as it was deemed too early. Still, some observations were made, such as the resemblance to both crocodylids and alligatorids and Australosuchus' possibly plesiomorphic state.

Later studies clarified the position of Australosuchus within Mekosuchinae, with it being commonly found at the base of the family. In a 2018 study using a combination of morphological, genetic and stratigraphic data, Lee and Yates recovered Australosuchus as the earliest diverging member of the family. Ristevski et al. (2023) meanwhile recovered it in various positions, but all still basal to the family. In four out of eight analysis, Ristevski too found Australosuchus to have been the basalmost mekosuchine. In one other analysis, this position is occupied by Kalthifrons while in yet another a clade formed by Kalthifrons and Kambara appears as more basal. However, both studies generally agree however that Australosuchus was a mekosuchine, which in their studies formed a monophyletic group.

- - Mekosuchinae
    - Australosuchus†
    - - - Kambara taraina†
        - Kambara implexidens†
      - - Kambara murgonensis†
        - - - - Kalthifrons†
              - Pallimnarchus†
            - - Baru wickeni†
              - - Baru darrowi†
                - Baru Alcoota†
          - - - Bullock Creek taxon†
              - "Baru" huberi†
            - - Volia†
              - - Mekosuchus†
                - - Trilophosuchus†
                  - Quinkana†
  - Longirostres

- - Crocodyloidea
    - "Crocodylus" megarhinus†
    - - Mekosuchinae
        - Kalthifrons aurivellensis†
        - - - Kambara spp.†
          - - Australosuchus clarkae†
            - - - "Baru" huberi†
                - - Trilophosuchus rackhami†
                  - - Volia athollandersoni†
                    - - Mekosuchus whitehunterensis†
                      - - Mekosuchus sanderi†
                        - Mekosuchus inexpectatus†
              - - Paludirex spp.†
                - - Baru spp.†
                  - Quinkana spp.†
      - Crocodylidae

There are some alternative placements however. In the purely morphology based analysis by Rio and Mannion (2021), Australosuchus was found outside of Mekosuchinae as the sister taxon to the Crocodylidae. While the majority of the phylogenetic analysis conducted by Ristevski et al. in 2023 did recover monophyletic mekosuchines as shown above, two of their results departed greatly from the consensus and came closer to the results of Rio and Mannion. In these two outliers, Australosuchus was found within the clade Longirostres, leading up to crocodylids alongside Kambara. However, the results of both these analysis are striking departures from previously recovered results. Furthermore, the study of Rio and Mannion was limited to purely morphological features, while the outlier results recovered by Ristevski and his team are acknowledged as being poorly supported in their study.

- - - - Kambara implexidens
      - - Kambara taraina
        - - Kambara murgonensis
          - "Asiatosuchus" nanlingensis
    - - - Baru darrowi
        - Baru wickeni
      - - "Baru" huberi
        - - Trilophosuchus rackhami
          - - Ultrastenos willisi
            - Mekosuchus whitehunterensis
            - Mekosuchus sanderi
            - Mekosuchus inexpectatus
  - - Australosuchus clarkae
    - Crocodylidae
      - Osteolaeminae
      - Crocodylinae
        - - Quinkana
          - "Crocodylus" megarhinus
        - Crocodylus

- Crocodilia
  - Alligatoroidea
  - - Planocraniidae
    - - - "Asiatosuchus" germanicus
        - Mekosuchinae
          - - Kalthifrons aurivellensis
            - - Quinkana spp.
              - - Baru spp.
                - Paludirex spp.
          - - Orientalosuchina
              - Krabisuchus siamogallicus
              - - Orientalosuchus naduongensis
                - - Jiangxisuchus nankangensis
                  - Eoalligator chunyii
            - - Dongnanosuchus hsui
              - - "Baru" huberi
                - - Volia athollandersoni
                  - Trilophosuchus rackhami
                  - Mekosuchus spp.
      - - Prodiplocynodon langi
        - - - "Crocodylus" affinis
            - "Crocodylus" depressifrons
          - - "Crocodylus" acer
            - Brachyuranochampsa eversolei
          - Longirostres
            - Gavialoidea
            - - Australosuchus clarkae
              - - - Kambara implexidens
                  - - Kambara taraina
                    - Kambara murgonensis
                - Crocodylidae

== Paleobiology ==
Given the lack of any specialised adaptations such as ziphodont teeth or a longirostrine skull form, Australosuchus is thought to have been a more generalized member of the Mekosuchinae.

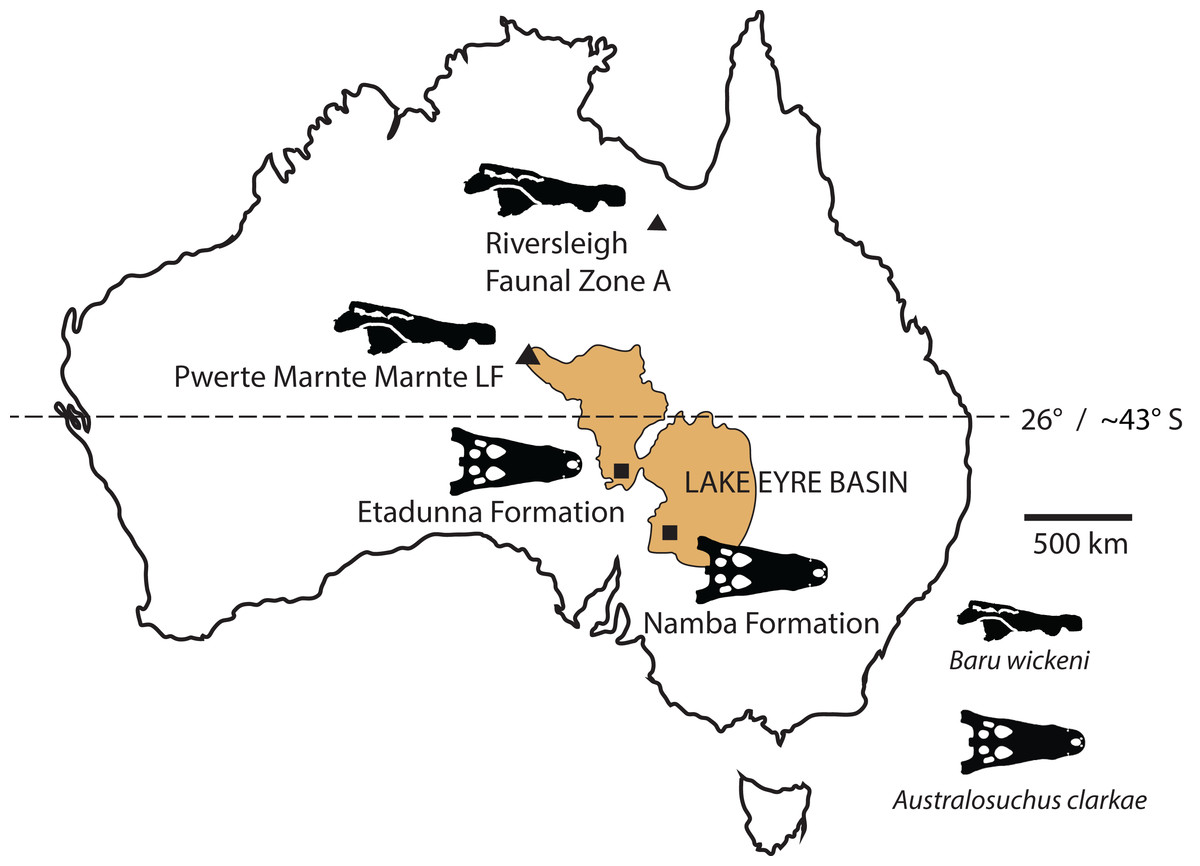
Distribution of Baru wickeni compared to that of Australosuchus.

Australosuchus is the southern-most known mekosuchine, with its range extending as far south as Lake Pinpa. This renders Australosuchus relatively isolated from the diverse crocodilian fauna found in more northern parts of Australia at the time, notably that of the Riversleigh World Heritage Area which was inhabited by another semi-aquatic generalist, Baru. This separation is striking, as Australosuchus remains are incredibly abundant in South Australia, yet no remains of this species have ever been found in more northern regions. Likewise, Baru is common across the Northern Territory and Queensland, yet absent in the south. As these ecosystems overlapped in time, a geographic solution was proposed by Paul Willis in 1997. Willis suggested that, as semi-aquatic forms, both Baru and Australosuchus were restricted to the large drainage systems of their range, which would entail the Lake Eyre Basin for Australosuchus and the Karumba Basin for Baru. He argues that they were simply too dependent on bodies of water to travel between the two regions. However, this notion was later refuted by Adam Yates following the discovery of Baru remains in the Pwerte Marnte Marnte deposit. These deposits are located at the northern edge of the Lake Eyre Basin, which shows that Baru and Australosuchus, though geographically separate, still had access to the same basin at the same time. Yates further highlights that plenty of freshwater systems would have been present between the two basins, theoretically allowing even semi-aquatic forms to travel between them.

Yates instead offers a different explanation for the apparent lack of overlap in the range of Australosuchus and other mekosuchines, latitude. While both occur in the Lake Eyre Basin, all records of Australosuchus stem from below 27°S while no Baru are found south of 25°S. Given the occurrence at Lake Pinpa, this puts the range of Australosuchus between 31°S and 27°S, which during the Oligocene corresponds to a latitude of 45° and 50°S. Yates highlights this range as significant in two ways. For one, it far exceeds the latitude at which any modern crocodilian is found at, with today's northernmost species being the American alligator which ranges up to 36°N. Furthermore, while this is a great latitude already by modern standards, Yates additionally notes that the Oligocene represents a cold period within Australia's history, putting further emphasis on how unusual the range of Australosuchus was. A possible explanation for this may be that Australosuchus was exceptionally cold resistant, thriving in temperatures too low for other contemporary mekosuchines.
