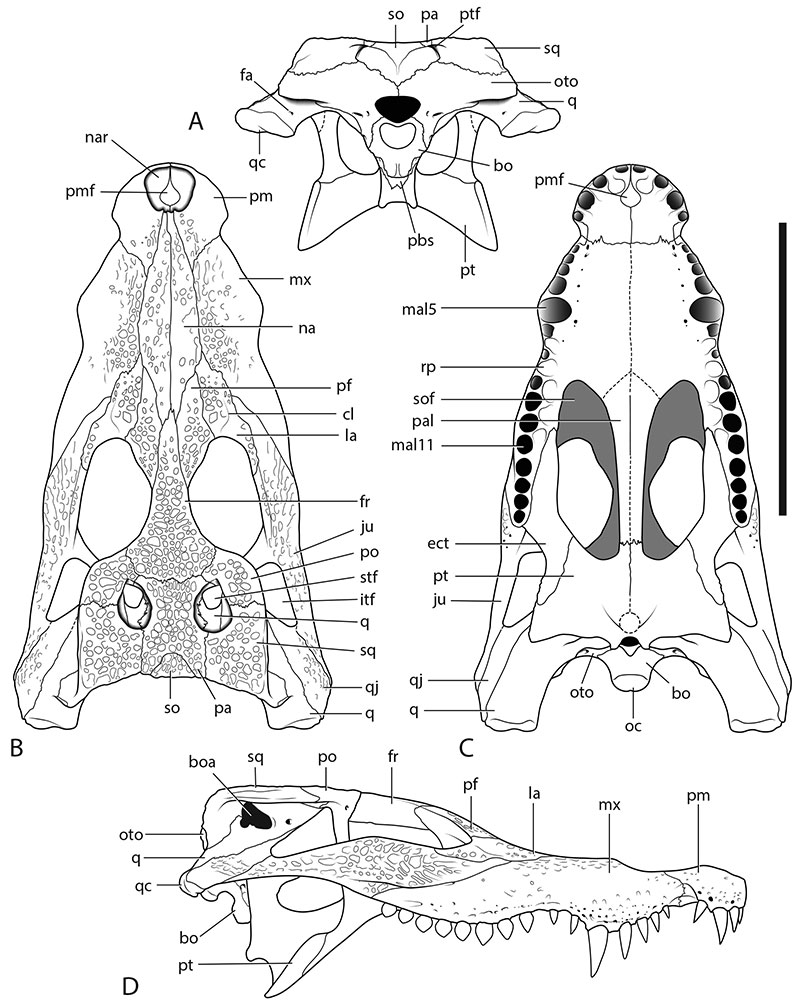

Scientific classification
- Kingdom: Animalia
- Phylum: Chordata
- Class: Reptilia
- Order: Crocodylia
- Clade: †Mekosuchinae
- Genus: †Ultrastenos; Stein et al., 2016

Type species
- Ultrastenos willisi Stein et al., 2016 (Junior synonym)

Species
- U. huberi (Willis, 1997)

Synonyms
- Baru huberi Willis, 1997; Ultrastenos willisi

= Ultrastenos =

Ultrastenos Temporal range: Late Oligocene, 28.1–23 Ma

Extinct genus of reptiles

Ultrastenos is an extinct genus of Australian mekosuchine crocodilian that lived during the Late Oligocene in northwestern Queensland, Australia. Following its discovery, it was speculated that Ultrastenos was a slender-snouted animal similar to modern gharials or freshwater crocodiles due to the seemingly abruptly narrowing mandible. However, a later study found that this was a misinterpretation of the fossil specimen and that Ultrastenos instead had a more generalized lower jaw. The same publication also provided evidence that the fossils of Ultrastenos belonged to the same animal previously named "Baru" huberi, adding further evidence to the idea that the animal was short snouted, contrary to the initial hypothesis. Given that "Baru" huberi was named first, the type species of Ultrastenos changed from U. willisi to U. huberi in accordance with the rules of the ICZN. Ultrastenos was a small mekosuchine, measuring upwards of 1.5 m (4 ft 11 in) long.

== History and naming ==
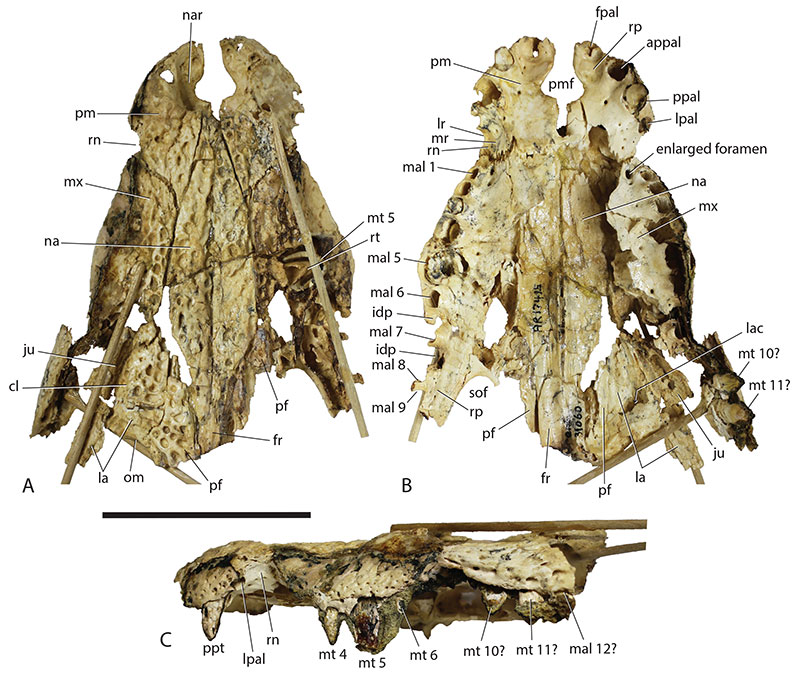
QM F31060, described as Baru huberi by Willis in 1997.

The research history of Ultrastenos is primarily recorded through the independent descriptions of two taxa long thought distinct from each other: Ultrastenos willisi and "Baru" huberi. "Baru" huberi is the older name among the two, coined by Paul Willis in 1997 for an incomplete rostrum found within the Late Oligocene strata of the White Hunter Site within the Riversleigh World Heritage Area. The description of "Baru" huberi was centered around QM F31060, an incomplete rostrum that Willis believed to be similar to that of Baru, thus assigning it to the same genus. Within the same work Willis also named and described a variety of other mekosuchines from the site including Mekosuchus whitehunterensis, Quinkana meboldi and Baru wickeni. Among the described but unnamed material is one fossil that later proved as one of the most significant finds for this taxon's history, several skull fragments including skull tables only referred to as the White Hunter cranial form 1. Though Willis recognized that they could belong to one of the taxa he named, he refrained from assigning them to any species in particular given the lack of overlap.

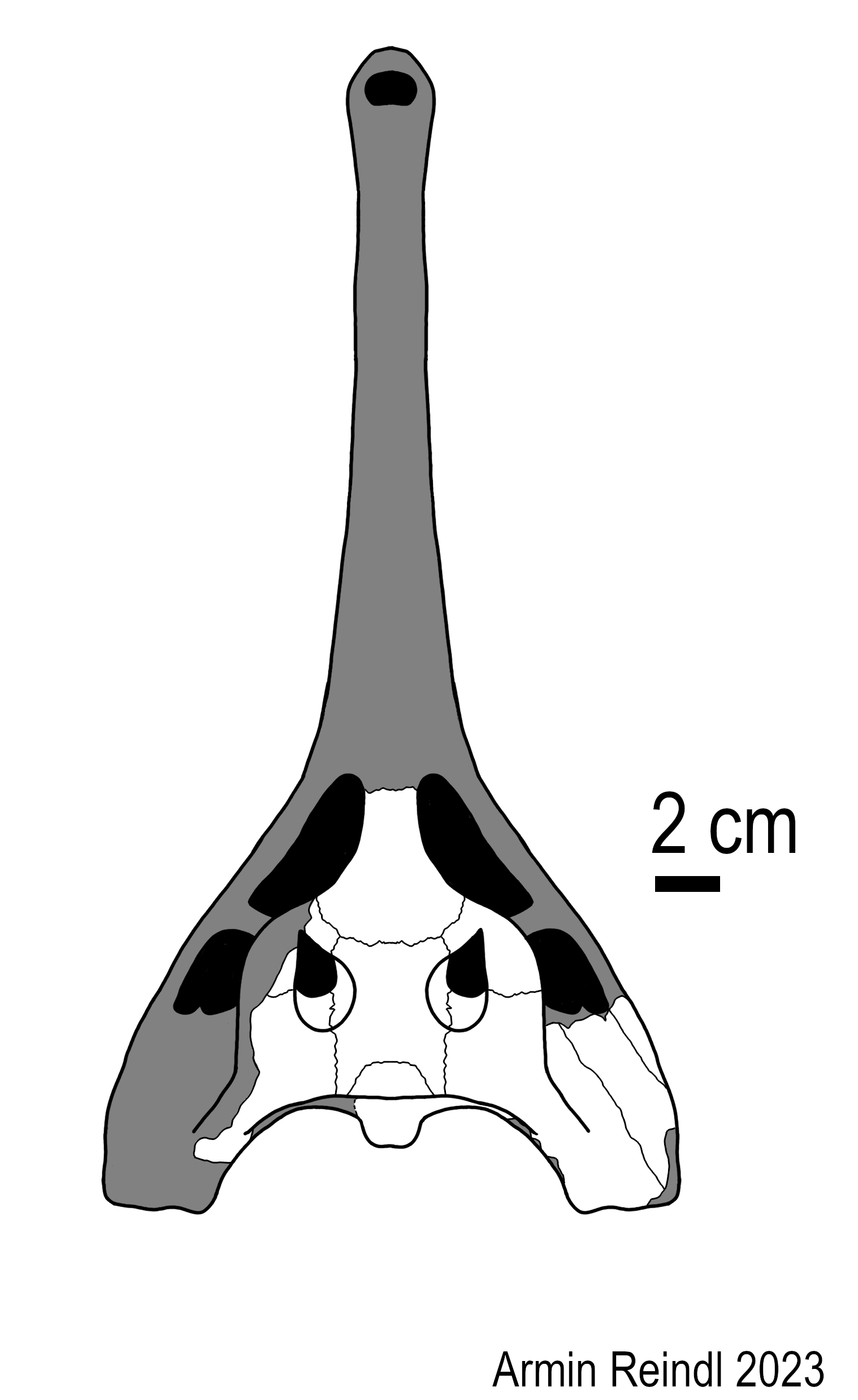
When Ultrastenos was described in 2016 it was interpreted to have been a longirostrine animal with narrow jaws.

The genus Ultrastenos, meanwhile, was described almost 20 years later in 2016 based on the holotype specimen QM F42665, a posterior cranium and mandible found at the Low Lion Site of the Riversleigh World Heritage Area. While Riversleigh had already produced a variety of other mekosuchine genera of varying morphology, the discovery of Ultrastenos was initially thought to represent a unique new morphotype within this group. More specifically, Ultrastenos was believed to be the first Riversleigh crocodilian to display highly elongated jaws similar to those of modern gharials. In addition to the holotype material, multiple fossil remains were assigned as the paratypes. These remains cover various elements of the postcranial skeleton, including multiple vertebrae of the neck and tail, some osteoderms, a coracoid and limb bones. Furthermore, Stein et al. went on to propose that Willis' White Hunter cranial form 1 also belonged to Ultrastenos given some similarities in proportions, assigning the various fragments to Ultrastenos.

Subsequent years saw some of the hypothesis surrounding these two taxa questioned. Research began to increasingly show that "Baru" huberi was not as closely tied to other species of Baru as initially thought. This research included not only the genus revision of Baru published by Adam M. Yates in 2017 but also multiple phylogenetic analysis conducted in 2018, 2021 and 2023. Yates' paper on Baru further questioned the referral of one of the White Hunter crania (QM F31075) to Ultrastenos, instead proposing that it belonged to a juvenile Baru wickeni, while Ristevski and colleagues challenged the interpretation of Ultrastenos as a longirostrine form. The team, which included Stein, alluded to a re-description of the taxon being in the works following the discovery of a related form.

This re-description was eventually published in 2024 and tackled both the generic identity of "Baru" huberi as well as the question surrounding the anatomy of Ultrastenos. Authored by both Yates and Stein, the paper found that rather than being two distinct but poorly known taxa, the two animals were actually one and the same. Key in this was Willis' White Hunter cranial form 1. Yates and Stein determined that one of the fossils, QM F31076, perfectly matched the holotype of "Baru" huberi, suggesting that both fossils belong to the same individual. Several lines of evidence are cited in favour of this line of thinking. For example, both are similar in their preservation, despite the fact that material from the White Hunter Site can vary considerably in appearance (as evidenced by the other fossils assigned to White Hunter cranial form 1). The specimens match not only in preservation but also in size, with the parallel edges of the respective fossils interpreted as marking a fracture caused by erosion that separated the elements prior to collection. Another feature that unifies the specimens is the identical skull ornamentation, which is distinct from those of the other White Hunter crocodilians. Finally, both the "Baru" huberi holotype and QM F31076 overlap with material from Bullock Creek, thought to be a related species that shares many of the same apomorphies. The team also argues against Yates' previous referral of QM F31075 to Baru wickeni, in part due to the ontogeny of this genus now being better understood thanks to Baru iylwenpeny, though a juvenile specimen previously held as "Baru" huberi was in turn referred to Baru wickeni. In addition to material previously referred to either Ultrastenos willisi or "Baru" huberi, the team also refers two previously undescribed fossils to Ultrastenos.

The genus name derives from the Latin "ultra" for extreme and the Greek "stenos" for narrow, chosen to reflect the morphology of the animal's mandible as interpreted by Stein and colleagues. Though the species name chosen by them was initially meant to honour Paul Willis, the rules of the ICZN meant that the species name of "Baru" huberi took priority. Consequently, this created the combination Ultrastenos huberi, with the species name honoring Professor Huber, who was employed as rector at the University of Bonn, Germany.

== Description ==
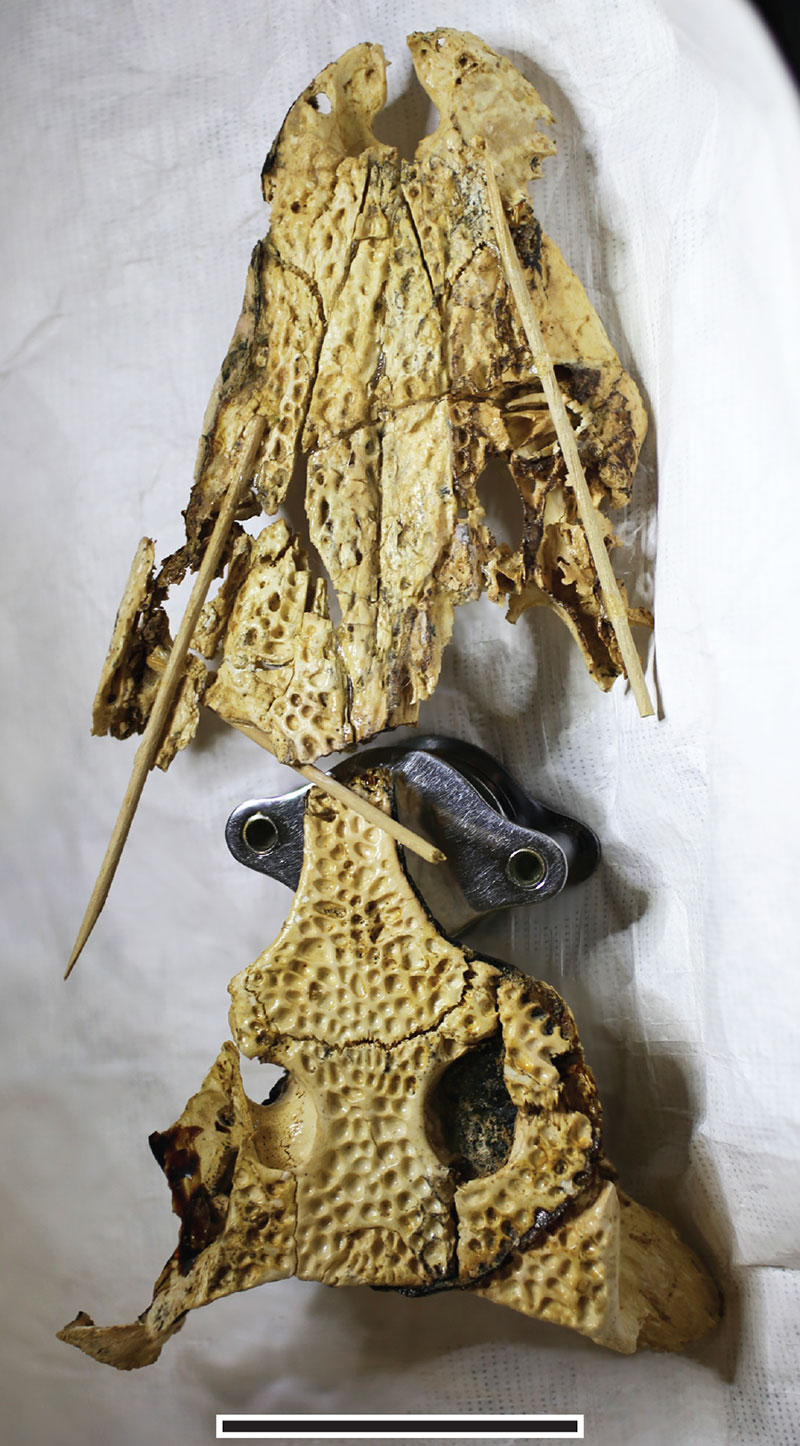
One of the most complete Ultrastenos skulls was long thought to have belonged to two different animals.

=== Skull ===
Ultrastenos, contrary to its name, had a snout described as platyrostral and brevirostrine skull, meaning its snout was flattened and short rather than elongated as initially proposed by Stein and colleagues and bearing a slight resemblance to more generalized mekosuchines such as Baru.

The external nares are positioned rather closely to the very tip of the snout, which makes the premaxilla appear steep when seen in profile view, which is similar to what is observed in Baru with its almost vertical premaxillary tip, though not nearly as robust as in these larger taxa. Overall the naris is longer than it is wide and directed anterodorsally, meaning it opens slightly towards the front of the skull rather than facing purely upwards as is typically seen in many semi-aquatic crocodilians. As is common among crocodilians, a prominent notch is present between the final tooth of the premaxilla and the first tooth of the maxilla, allowing for a smooth insertion of an enlarged dentary tooth. In Ultrastenos, this notch is bordered by two prominent ridges. The nasal bones stretch across the rostrum and come into contact with the nares. Willis compared this condition to Baru wickeni and used it to differentiate Ultrastenos from Baru darrowi when he still considered these animals to be congeneric. While the nares and nasals contact, the nasals do not extend into the former. The lacrimals feature a subtle ridge that divides the surface and its ornamentation into two sections, one anteromedial close to the nasals and prefrontals and another posterolaterally, near the lateral edge of the eye sockets. This ridge, dubbed the canthus lacrimalis to distinguish it from similar structures in caimans and saltwater crocodiles, is described as being similar though weaker than what can also be seen in Baru wickeni. The quadrate and quadratojugal are curved inward (medioventrally), especially towards the front where they contact the jugal, which is similarly constricted. Furthermore, the jugal as a whole is gracile and short. The jugal forms the base of the postorbital bar and bears a foramen in this region of the skull. The distance between the eye sockets is narrow and leads into the trapezoid skull table. The supratemporal fenestrae are prominent and teardrop-shaped, as noted by both Stein and colleagues in 2016 and Yates and Stein in 2024. Through these fenestrae the supratemporal fossae are visible, as the surrounding bones of the skull table do not overhang these openings.

The occiput, the back of the head, is wide yet shallow, forming a concave surface that runs perpendicular to the quadrates. The squamosals are not well expressed at the back of the head and the posterolateral processes are only weakly developed, not extending as far back as in other crocodilians. Something similar can be observed with the paroccipital process, a part of the exoccipital, which is likewise poorly developed and rounded, but still clearly set apart from the quadrate and squamosal. The basioccipital, which forms the base of the occiput, is a tall element that's significantly wider at the top and narrows towards the bottom with a prominent keel running down its vertical surface. The foramen magnum, through which the spinal cord passes, appears as an inverted triangle just above the occipital condyle that articulates with the first neck vertebra.

The lower surface of the jaw shows a distinct premaxillary fenestra, a hole on the opposite side of the nares, that is located behind the first pair of premaxillary teeth. While the dorsal surface of the premaxilla extends back to the position of the third maxillary teeth, the ventral surface ends much sooner, contacting the maxillae at the level of the large notch and forming a nearly straight transverse suture. The paired suborbital fenestrae are notably larger than the single premaxillary fenestra and extend backwards roughly from the position of the seventh or eight maxillary tooth socket depending on the specimen, though in both cases this places the beginning of these openings before the beginning of the orbits. The front-most parts of the suborbital fenestrae are comparably narrow thanks to an expansion of the palatines, which were otherwise narrow. The pterygoids are large elements that form part of the palate. In Ultrastenos the corners of the pterygoids extend beyond the back of the choanae, which itself is surrounded by ridges.

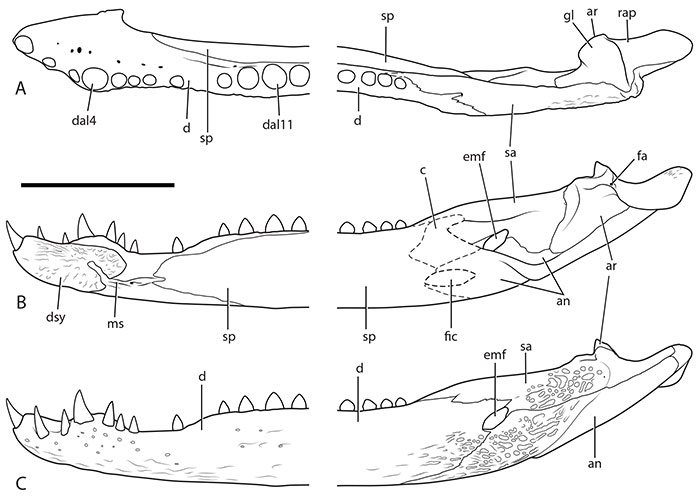
The reconstructed lower jaw of Ultrastenos.

Yates and Stein describe Ultrastenos as having had four premaxillary teeth in adults, stating that the number seen in hatchlings is not known. This contrasts with Willis' older claim that juveniles had five premaxillary teeth, which was based on a specimen now referred to Baru wickeni. The precise number of maxillary teeth is uncertain, but was likely somewhere between 14 and 15 teeth on either side. The latter interpretation is followed by Yates and Stein on the basis of specimen QM F61097, but it cannot be ruled out that Ultrastenos only had 14 teeth as suggested by Willis, which is still a pair less than in Baru. There is little space between the first six alveoli and no signs of reception pits for the dentary dentition. Among these first six alveoli the fifth is the largest, outsizing even the fourth premaxillary alveolus, and forming the peak of a mild festoon (a wave-like rise within the toothrow). From the sixth to the ninth alveolus the teeth become more widely spaced, though the individual gaps are uneven in size. This area also preserves some reception pits between the individual teeth, most prominently both before and after the seventh maxillary tooth and to a lesser degree further back. This leads into a second series of closely spaced teeth following the tenth tooth, which also coincides with a second festoon that peaks around the tenth or eleventh tooth. Overall most teeth of the maxilla are described as subcircular, meaning that they lacked significant labiolingual compression.

=== Mandible ===
The first teeth of the lower jaw neatly slide into a pair of occlusal pits located in the underside of the premaxilla, however, while these pits are deep they do not pierce the upper surface of the skull. As in many crocodilians, the fourth teeth of the lower jaw are notably enlarged and slide into the notches located near the contact between premaxilla and maxilla. The mandibular symphysis, the region where the two halves of the dentary meet to form the front of the lower jaw, is shorter than in Baru, only extending until the fifth to sixth dentary tooth. Following the first festoon that peaks with the fourth dentary tooth comes a second, posterior festoon that reaches its highest point at the level of the tenth to eleventh dentary teeth. This festoon appears as larger than the first in some individuals, though the difference is only minor in others. The precise tooth count of the lower jaw is unknown, but Yates and Stein suggest a minimum of 16 mandibular teeth based on the various fossils that have been collected.

=== Postcrania ===
A variety of isolated bones of the postcranial skeleton of Ultrastenos are known, including fragments of the first cervical vertebra, the atlas. The intercentrum, which forms the lower part of the atlas, is tall and both it and the neural arch are elongated in length. Similar proportions can be observed in the tail vertebrae (caudal vertebrae). In addition to this, the faces of the caudals, the part of the centrum that faces the preceding or following vertebra, are expanded downwards, same as the chevrons. The osteoderms forming part of the paratype stem from the dorsal shield, the armour that is situated along the back of the animal, and are moderately robust in morphology with deep pits but lacking a medial ridge. This anatomy is indistinguishable from what is seen in modern crocodiles, and similarly the toe bones are also identical to those of modern species. The preserved portions of the coracoid are likewise similar to members of the genus Crocodylus, but the proximal head is elongated and forming an acute triangle. The glenoid facet, which is the coracoids contribution to the shoulder joint, is only weakly displaced towards the back of the element. The only difference between the tibia of Ultrastenos and modern crocodiles is that in the mekosuchine it is flattened front to back and the shaft becomes more square as it moves away from the hip.

=== Size ===
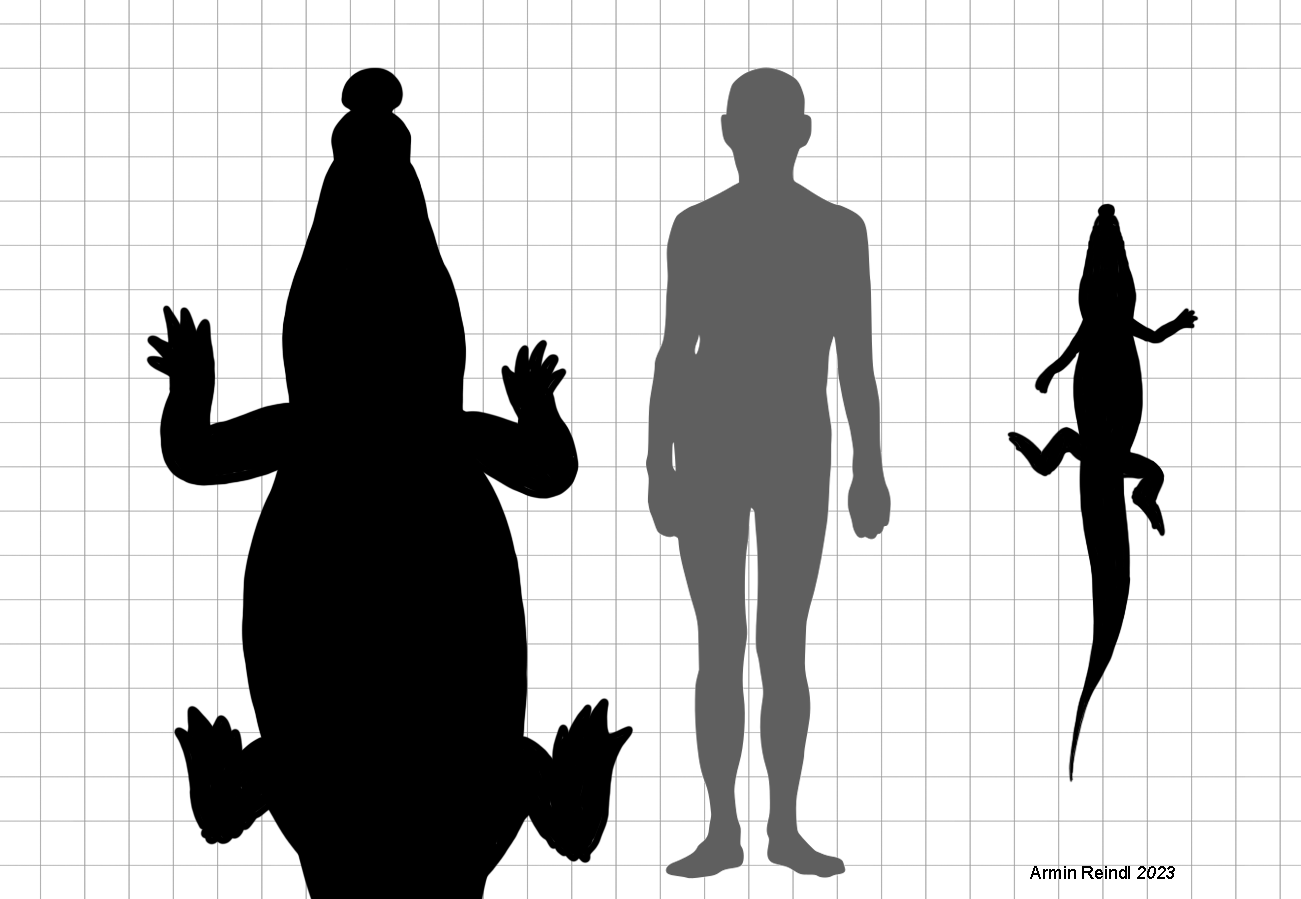
Ultrastenos (based on QM F31060) compared to the contemporary Baru wickeni.

Ultrastenos has been noted for its relatively small size by multiple authors across its research history, with both Willis and Yates remarking on the substantial size difference between it and the genus Baru in regards to the material previously known as "Baru" huberi. The holotype skull of "B." huberi measures approximately 20 cm (7.9 in) long with a width of around 11 cm (4.3 in), with Stephen Wroe estimating a total length of around 1.5 m (4 ft 11 in) for the animal. The material used to establish Ultrastenos in 2016 was however significantly larger, measuring 16–18 cm (6.3–7.1 in) wide between the quadrates and some 35 cm (14 in) in length. While this would naturally yield a larger total length than that estimated by Wroe, it would still have been a small-bodied animal similar in size to the extant freshwater crocodile, yet still larger than the known mekosuchine dwarf forms such as Trilophosuchus and Mekosuchus.

== Longirostry versus brevirostry ==
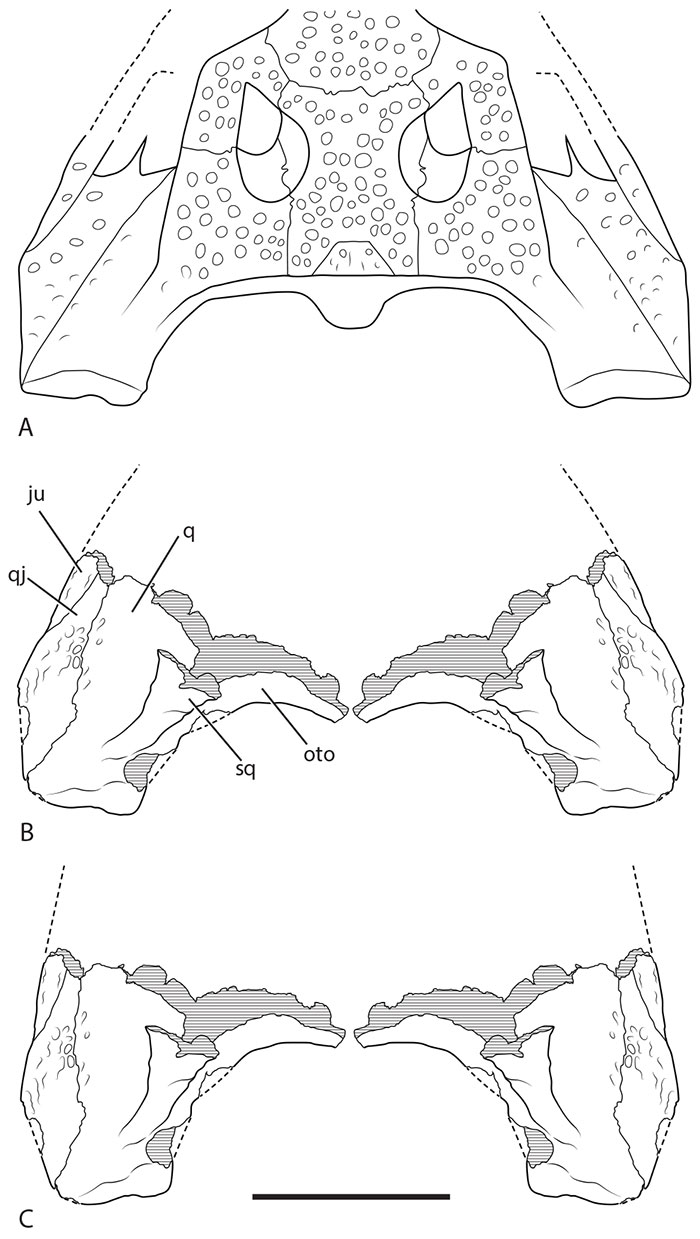
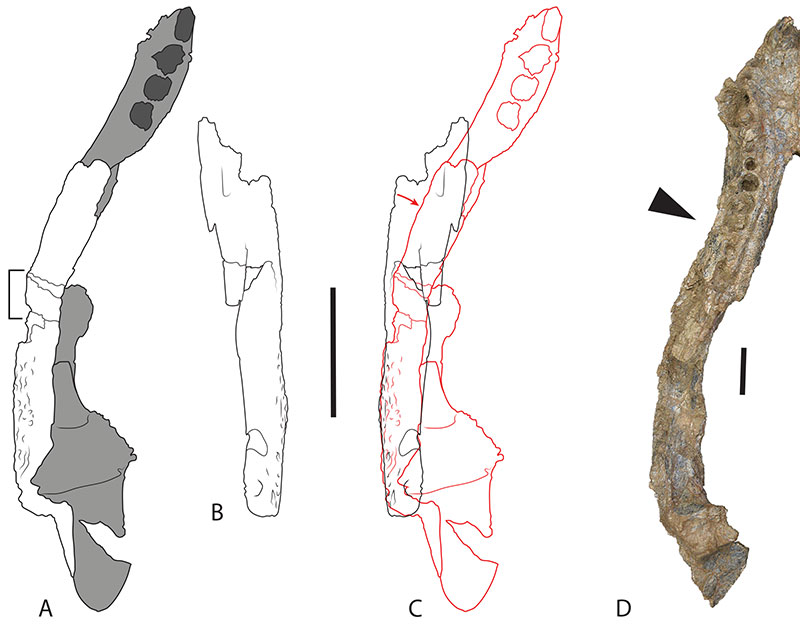
The idea that Ultastenos was longirostrine was in part based on the incorrect orientation of the temporal region (top) and the exaggerated bending of the mandible (bottom, compared with Baru iylwenpeny).

Initially, Stein and colleagues proposed that Ultrastenos could have been a longirostrine animal, meaning that unlike in any other known mekosuchine, the jaws would have been long and narrow like in modern gharials. This interpretation was largely based on the seemingly rapid construction of the mandible as inferred from QM F42665. Even at the time there were some doubts on the correctness of this hypothesis however. One alternative possibility considered by the team was that the snout was relatively short, stopping not far beyond the point of preservation, which was likened to Mekosuchus or modern dwarf caimans and dwarf crocodiles. However, this hypothesis was quickly discarded as in altirostral forms the mandible generally displays very deep mandibles, which clashes with the anatomy of Ultrastenos. Further evidence originally cited in favour of longirostry included shared traits between modern longirostrine crocodilians and Ultrastenos include the uniform dentition and shallow mandible. The retroarticular process, while not as elongated as in gavialoids, is similar to that of freshwater crocodiles too.

Against this stand a variety of other features as highlighted in Yates and Stein, 2024. For instance, the depth of the cranium, as measured from the skull table to the bottom of the pterygoid flanges (dubbed pterygoid flange depth by Iijima (2017)) correlates with brevirostrine morphology, contradicting the longirostrine interpretation of the mandible. Though the actual pterygoid flanges are not preserved, their depth has been inferred based on the already deep occipital region, which is especially prominent in the White Hunter cranium. Though fairly similar in morphology, the teeth of the mandible also do not conform with longirostry. Crocodilians with slender snouts generally possess needle-like caniniform teeth, whereas those in the mandible of Ultrastenos are molariforms (low crowned, elongated mediodistally and with nearly equilateral sides). It is further highlighted that the homodonty of the posterior most teeth does not necessarily mean the same is applicable to the entire toothrow. Yet another point raised against longirostry is the size of the supratemporal fenestra relative to the skull table. In the White Hunter cranium, the ratio is similar to that seen in basal mekosuchines like Australosuchus and Kambara (both are mesorostral generalists) and the modern Orinoco crocodile, which is regarded as the least-specialised of today's longirostrine taxa. While the shallow mandible does argue against altirostry, it is pointed out in the 2024 paper that it does not rule out platyrostry, i.e. a flattened skull, while the elongated retroarticular process itself is not diagnostic for longirostry.

Yates and Stein further highlight how the longirostry as inferred by Stein and colleagues heavily rests upon the way the mandible was reconstructed. For instance, since the mandibles were not found in articulation with the other material, the angle at which the two mandibular rami converge may have been exaggerated. This is illustrated well by the orientation of the quadrate and quadratojugal, which following some slight rotation could just as well support a much shallower angle of convergence and thus a less rapid construction of the rostrum, congruent with a brevirostrine morphology. Reassembly of the mandible further shows that the left, more complete element is much more bent inward than its right counterpart, further exaggerating the constriction which itself is not concrete evidence for longirostry as shown by the clearly brevirostrine Baru iylwenpeny.

Finally, the most damning evidence against the longirostrine hypothesis stems from the fact that Yates and Stein identified one of the White Hunter crania as having most likely been derived from the same individual as the holotype of "Baru" huberi, which consists of a partial rostrum clearly showing mesorostral and platyrostral morphology, i.e. more generalized anatomy. This is only cemented by the anatomy of the Bullock Creek taxon, a closely related but distinct taxon that overlaps with both "Baru" huberi and Ultrastenos. Not only does the anatomy of this taxon support the idea that both Riversleigh taxa are the same species, but also provides a largely complete mandibular ramus that is clearly brevirostrine, yet simultaneously displays the same characteristics as the mandible of Ultrastenos, thus clearly suggesting that Ultrastenos did not have elongated jaws.

=== Implications for Mekosuchinae ===
The discovery that Ultrastenos was most likely not the longirostrine animal initially thought to have been does raise the question why this morphology did not arise within mekosuchines. The only other potential candidate for this anatomy would be Harpacochampsa from the Middle Miocene, however, while initially placed within Mekosuchinae studies since then have increasingly come to favour the interpretation that it was either a gavialoid or a basal crocodyloid. The reason why mekosuchines seemingly lacked longirostrine forms is not fully understood, but multiple suggestions have been made. For instance, it is possible that much like alligators, the development of slender jaws within this group is prevented by certain developmental constraints that occur during the growth of these animals. Alternatively, it is possible that piscivory, unlike other lifestyles, was simply not viable throughout much of Australia's prehistory. Stein and colleagues highlight the fact that fish were relatively uncommon in Riversleigh in their 2016 description of Ultrastenos, at the time arguing that a longirostrine Ultrastenos may instead have fed on small vertebrates like birds or amphibians instead. Another possibility posits that mekosuchines were barred from becoming longirostrine due to the presence of other crocodilians already occupying this niche. During the Eocene this might have been a fragmentary taxon from the Corinda Formation of uncertain affinities, while Miocene and Pliocene to Pleistocene strata show the presence of gavialoids (though neither Harpacochampsa nor Gunggamarandu have well preserved rostra), with the modern freshwater crocodile also being present during the Late Pleistocene.

== Phylogeny ==
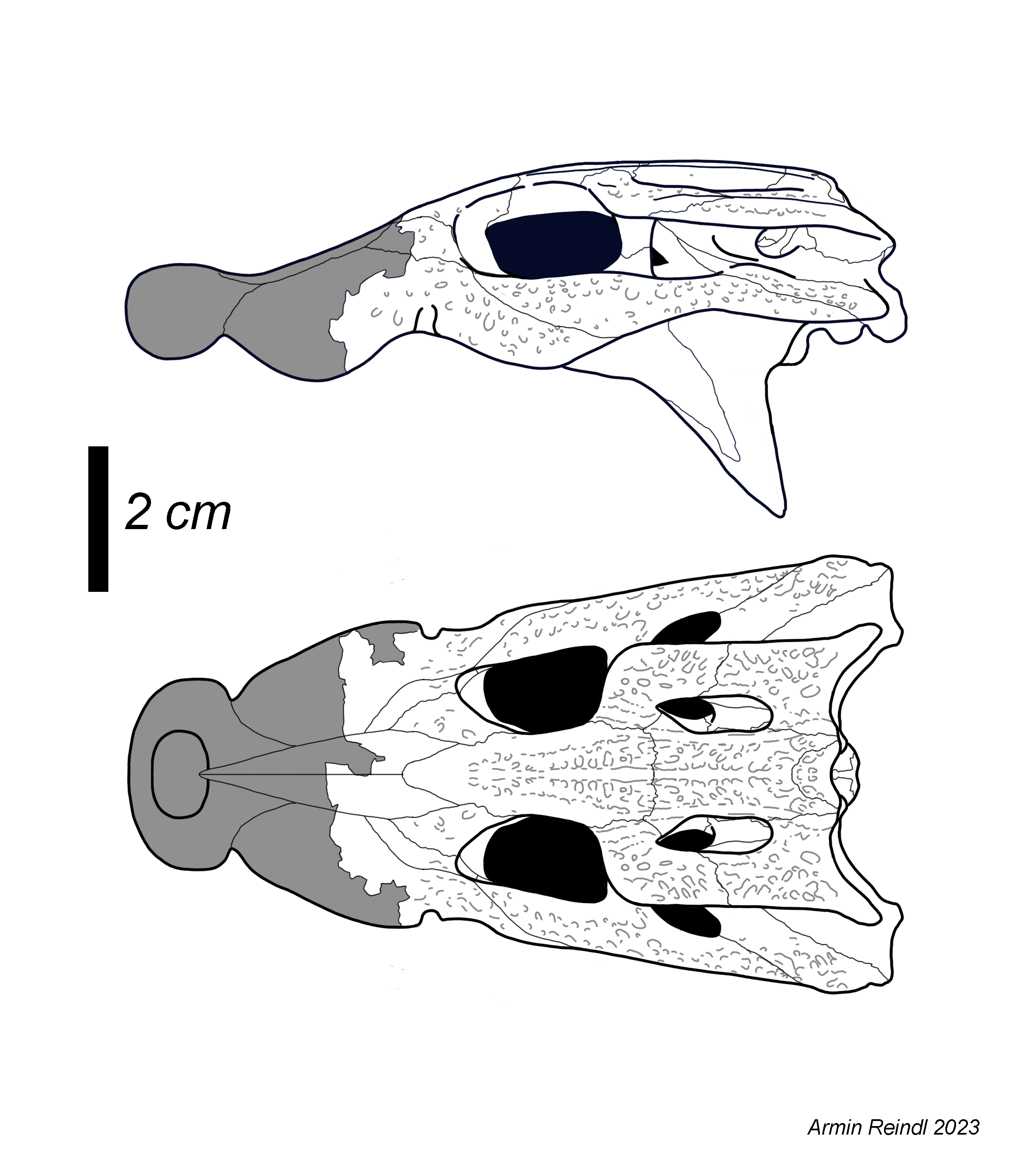
Among the closest relatives of Ultrastenos were dwarf taxa such as Trilophosuchus.

As Ultrastenos was regarded as two different forms prior to the 2024 redescription, phylogenies exist for both the rostrum and the cranium separately, both of which do however already showed signs that would later be confirmed by Yates and Stein.

In Stein et al. (2016) Ultrastenos is recovered as a mekosuchine crocodilian and sister taxa to Trilophosuchus rackhami, with which it shares a vertical exoccipital. Based on prior phylogenetic analysis this would suggest placement within Mekosuchini, however in Stein et al.'s analysis Mekosuchini as previously defined has lost cohesion. This is because in the recovered results, Trilophosuchus was recovered as more basal than Kambara, a platyrostral species from the Eocene. Although Ultrastenos was much more fragmentary at the time, the primary issues with the phylogeny were actually caused by the uncertain placement of Harpacochampsa, which according to some may be a gavialoid. Another study discussing the phylogenetic position of Ultrastenos was that of Rio and Mannion, published in 2021. Their study argued that many previously established mekosuchines were not mekosuchines at all but instead belonged to different groups. Ultrastenos did maintain its placement within the group, but was recovered in a polytomy alongside the various species of Mekosuchus, with Trilophosuchus being placed as said groups sister taxon.

- - Mekosuchinae
    - Harpacochampsa camfieldensis
    - - - Trilophosuchus rackhami
        - Ultrastenos willisi
      - - Kambara murgonensis
        - - - Quinkana spp.
            - Australosuchus clarkae
          - - Volia athollandersoni
            - - Baru darrowi
              - Mekosuchus sanderi

- - Mekosuchinae
    - - Kambara implexidens
      - - Kambara taraina
        - - Kambara murgonensis
          - "Asiatosuchus" nanlingensis
    - - - Baru darrowi
        - Baru wickeni
      - - "Baru" huberi
        - - Trilophosuchus rackhami
          - - Ultrastenos willisi
            - Mekosuchus whitehunterensis
            - Mekosuchus sanderi
            - Mekosuchus inexpectatus
  - - Australosuchus clarkae
    - Crocodylidae
      - Osteolaeminae
      - Crocodylinae
        - - Quinkana
          - "Crocodylus" megarhinus
        - Crocodylus

Phylogenetic analysis conducted for the rostrum under the name "Baru" huberi meanwhile have focused more on the relationship of the taxon with the genus Baru, repeatedly showing that the species to be unrelated to B. darrowi and B. wickeni. In Lee and Yates (2018), "Baru" huberi was recovered as being closely related to the Bullock Creek taxon, with which it forms a clade that sits at the base of the group including traditionally terrestrial forms like Trilophosuchus, Quinkana and Mekosuchus. The other Baru species meanwhile occupy a different branch within Mekosuchinae, with Lee and Yates finding them to be allied to Pallimnarchus (now Paludirex) and Kalthifrons, both of which are considered to have been more semi-aquatic forms. A later study from 2023 found similar results, showing derived mekosuchines split into two lineages. One containing Paludirex, the accepted species of Baru and Quinkana, whereas the other contains "Baru" huberi and the many dwarf and island forms.

- - Mekosuchinae
    - Australosuchus†
    - - - Kambara taraina†
        - Kambara implexidens†
      - - Kambara murgonensis†
        - - - - Kalthifrons†
              - Pallimnarchus†
            - - Baru wickeni†
              - - Baru darrowi†
                - Baru Alcoota†
          - - - Bullock Creek taxon†
              - "Baru" huberi†
            - - Volia†
              - - Mekosuchus†
                - - Trilophosuchus†
                  - Quinkana†
  - Longirostres

- - Crocodyloidea
    - "Crocodylus" megarhinus†
    - - Mekosuchinae
        - Kalthifrons aurivellensis†
        - - Kambara spp.†
          - - Australosuchus clarkae†
            - - - "Baru" huberi†
                - - Trilophosuchus rackhami†
                  - - Volia athollandersoni†
                    - - Mekosuchus whitehunterensis†
                      - - Mekosuchus sanderi†
                        - Mekosuchus inexpectatus†
              - - Paludirex spp.†
                - - Baru spp.†
                  - Quinkana spp.†
      - Crocodylidae

Though all these analysis treated Ultrastenos as distinct from "Baru" huberi, they did show both taxa repeatedly placed in the same general area of Mekosuchinae. Stein and colleagues were quick to link Ultrastenos to Trilphosuchus and Rio and Mannion recovered a clade featuring the traditional dwarf mekosuchines Mekosuchus and Trilophosuchus in close associatioan with Ultrastenos and "Baru" huberi (although this analysis placed the former closer to Mekosuchus). Lee and Yates already established the link between B." huberi and the Bullock Creek taxon in their 2018 paper with the two forming a clade at the base of the group containing the aforementioned dwarf forms, Volia and Quinkana and Ristevski et al. 2023 do much the same to the exclusion of Quinkana. Overall these results not only confirm the validity of Ultrastenos as a valid taxon, but also showed the presence of a distinct clade (Ultrastenos and the Bullock Creek taxon) that was likely present at the base of the group that lead up to Mekosuchus.

- - Crocodyloidea
    - "Crocodylus" megarhinus†
    - - Mekosuchinae
        - Kalthifrons aurivellensis†
        - - Kambara spp.†
          - - Australosuchus clarkae†
            - - - Ultrastenos†
                - - Trilophosuchus rackhami†
                  - - Volia athollandersoni†
                    - - Mekosuchus whitehunterensis†
                      - - Mekosuchus sanderi†
                        - Mekosuchus inexpectatus†
              - - Paludirex spp.†
                - - Baru spp.†
                  - Quinkana spp.†
      - Crocodylidae

== Paleobiology ==
Ultrastenos is known from two Oligocene localities of the Riversleigh World Heritage Area, the White Hunter Site and the Low Lion Site, with it being the most common crocodilian recovered from the former locality. The White Hunter Site is well known for its diverse crocodilian fauna, which besides Ultrastenos also included Mekosuchus whitehunterensis, Quinkana meboldi and Baru wickeni. While Mekosuchus and Quinkana are two possibly terrestrial animals and thus not in competition with the more semi-aquatic forms, Ultrastenos and Baru wickeni are thought to have been much more similar in niche. Both are believed to have been semi-aquatic generalists due to their broad, platyrostral skulls. One possible explanation for the two morphologically similar species being able to coexist is the great difference in size, with the smaller Ultrastenos evading the larger crocodilians of its ecosystem. Although the idea that the fossils of the White Hunter Site only came together due to transportation after death (thanatocoenosis) has been suggested, the local mammal fauna seems to suggest that the animals of the site were in fact truly sympatric.

During the Late Oligocene the Low Lion Site was predominantly covered by open forests but lacks evidence for extensive river systems or wetlands from this region. Instead, Ultrastenos may have been more at home in forest lakes and ponds that were drained through the underlying karstic limestone. This may find support in the type of environments nowadays inhabited by freshwater crocodiles, which may persist in bodies of water that are only temporary and not available all year round.
