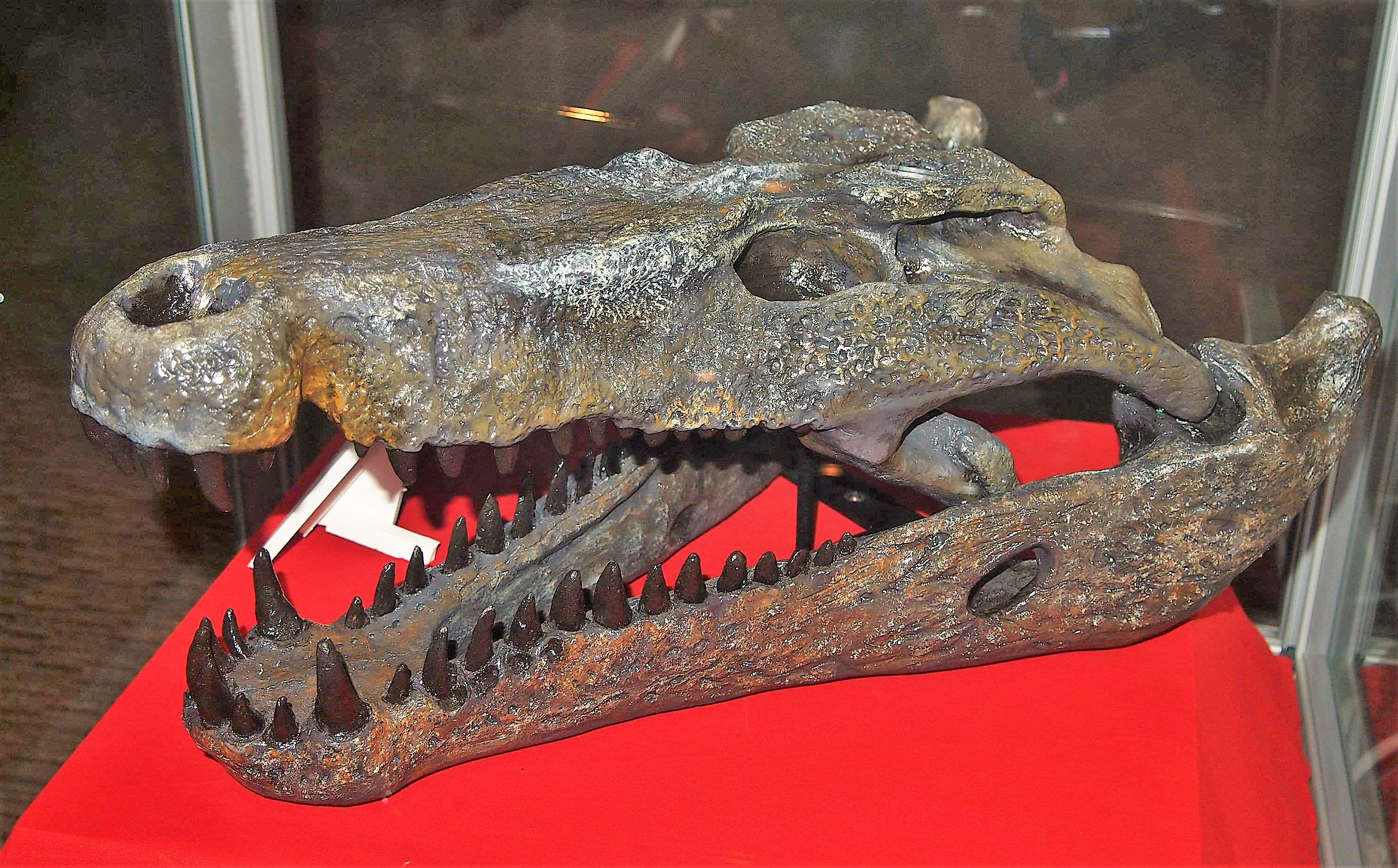
- Restoration of the skull of Q. timara at the Central Australian Museum

Scientific classification
- Kingdom: Animalia
- Phylum: Chordata
- Class: Reptilia
- Order: Crocodylia
- Clade: †Mekosuchinae
- Genus: †Quinkana; Molnar, 1981

Type species
- †Quinkana fortirostrum Molnar, 1981

Species
- †Quinkana fortirostrum Molnar, 1981 (type); †Quinkana timara Megirian, 1994; †Quinkana babarra Willis & Mackness, 1996; †Quinkana meboldi Willis, 1997

= Quinkana =

Quinkana Temporal range: Late Oligocene - Late Pleistocene, 25–0.02 Ma

Extinct genus of reptiles

Quinkana is an extinct genus of mekosuchine crocodylians that lived in Australia from about 25 million to about 20,000 years ago, with the majority of fossils having been found in Queensland. Four species are currently recognized, all of which have been named between 1981 and 1997. The two best understood species are Q. fortirostrum, the type species, and Q. timara, a more gracile form from the Miocene. The other two species, Q. babarra and Q. meboldi, from the Pliocene and Oligocene respectively, are only known from a few poorly preserved bone fragments. The name Quinkana comes from the "Quinkans", a legendary folk spirit from Gugu-Yalanji mythology.

Quinkana is primarily known for its ziphodont teeth, meaning they were recurved, serrated and possessed flattened sides that gave them a blade-like shape. However, technically such teeth are only known from two species, as the basal-most form lacked serrations while the holotype of Quinkana fortirostrum did not preserve teeth in its alveoli. The genus is distinguishable by the combination of these ziphodont teeth and a deep, altirostral skull that is sometimes compared to those of sebecosuchians and planocraniids, leading some early researchers to mistakenly assign Quinkana to said groups. Quinkana is typically estimated to be around 3 m (10 ft) in length and to weigh around 200 kg (440 lb), though some remains from the Pliocene could suggest an even greater size. However, these estimates are based on fragmentary specimens and dimensions of related genera as there have been no complete Quinkana specimens found.

The genus has been argued amongst paleontologists to be either terrestrial or semi-aquatic, with both sides providing a variety of arguments. Academic analysis cites comparative morphologies as indicators of Quinkana's habitation to be terrestrial, commonly comparing the anatomy of the crocodilian to other, more definitively terrestrial crocodylomorphs from the Mesozoic and early Cenozoic. The discovery of pelvic bones that belonged to a crocodilian with a pillar-erect stance in the same strata as Quinkana also support this line of thinking, even though no clear overlap to confirm this hypothesis exists. While the majority of mekosuchine researchers support the idea that Quinkana was terrestrial, some counter arguments have been raised in the past, especially highlighting that Quinkana is still consistently found to have lived near freshwater. The role Quinkana filled in the ecosystems of Late Pleistocene Australia has also been a matter of debate, with older literature in particular often claiming that the continent was dominated by reptilian predators. Opponents of this hypothesis meanwhile highlight how Quinkana was relatively rare, whereas large marsupial predators like Thylacoleo were much more common.

Regardless of its lifestyle and behavior, Quinkana is predominantly found in sediments preserving various types of woodland in proximity to bodies of water such as ponds, streams and billabongs. Though successfully surviving a drastic arid period that marked the transition from the Late Miocene to the Early Pliocene, Quinkana would eventually die out towards the end of the Pleistocene, with estimates suggesting that it died out somewhere between 40,000 and 20,000 years ago. The precise reasons for Quinkana's disappearance are unknown, but it is hypothesized that another period of intense aridification gradually dried up the river basins and destroyed the forests that the crocodilian inhabited, leading it to go extinct alongside much of Australia's megafauna.

== History and naming ==
As one of the first fossil crocodilians to be recognized from Australia, Quinkana has a long history. Some of the earliest fossil finds now attributed to this genus date as far back as 1886, when Charles Walter De Vis found a variety of fossil bones, including those of Quinkana, in the Darling Downs region of Queensland, which he informally dubbed Pallimnarchus pollens (now considered to be a nomen dubium). The research history of Quinkana began in earnest in 1970 with the discovery of fossil material in the Tea Tree Cave (part of the Chillagoe caves of Northern Queensland) by Lyndsey Hawkins, a member of the Sydney Speleological Society. The fossil specimen (AMF.57844) consisted of a partial rostrum, lacking the very tip of the snout and its teeth. This rostrum was noted for its unusual form, with a much deeper snout compared to extant crocodilians and tooth sockets indicative of ziphodont teeth, a combination of traits previously unknown from Australia. Preliminary comparisons were made with modern crocodylids as well as extinct groups that shared similar morphology, namely pristichampsines and sebecosuchians.

Locations of some Quinkana sp. fossils found in Queensland

Additional discoveries were made in the years following this event, with a second ziphodont crocodilian being recovered from the Texas Caves in southern Queensland in 1975 by Michael Archer. The Texas Cave crocodile, as it was referred to in later publications, consisted of a partial maxilla with some additional bone fragments that would be described in 1977 by Max Hecht and Michael Archer. Several further discoveries followed, many of which were eventually listed and briefly discussed once Quinkana was described. These early finds include not just the Texas Cave crocodile but also the Croydon specimens, the Rosella Plains teeth (originally identified as Megalania), the Darling Downs teeth and the Chinchilla jugal (named so after the town of Chinchilla, Queensland). Generally, these remains were isolated elements dating to the Pliocene and Pleistocene. Some remains have even been found near Lake Palankarinna in South Australia, though like the Texas Cave material they too were originally considered to have belonged to a sebecosuchian.

These discoveries caught the attention of paleontologist Ralph Molnar, who described Quinkana as a genus in 1981 based primarily on the rostrum from the Chillagoe caves, though he also dealt with much of the more fragmentary material including the Chinchilla jugal and teeth from the Darling Downs region. Molnar also assigned the Texas Cave crocodile to the genus but was hesitant to make an identification on a species level given some slight differences that may or may not be the result of ontogeny. The same is the case with most of the other material examined in this work, though the similarities to Quinkana were clear, the material was generally too fragmentary to be assigned to Quinkana fortirostrum specifically. In this early work, Molnar sets up several discussions regarding this taxon that would receive a lot of focus later on, in particular its relationship to other crocodilians and its ecology. Based on its unique cranial anatomy, Molnar cautiously proposed that Quinkana could have been a terrestrial predator, though he himself acknowledged several counterarguments to this hypothesis. Based on the same information, he also tentatively suggested a relationship between Quinkana and the European Pristichampsus.

Subsequent years saw a noticeable improvement in the scientific understanding of Australasian fossil crocodilians, with various species being described and finally being placed in the subfamily Mekosuchinae in 1993. Shortly after this, in 1994, Quinkana timara was named by paleontologist Dirk Megirian as a second species within the genus, although the timing of events meant that he could not properly address the newly erected Mekosuchinae in the main text of his publication. The holotype of Q. timara (NTM P895-19) consists of various snout fragments discovered within limestone found in the Bullock Creek Locality in the Northern Territory. In the same paper, Megirian also attributes multiple other fossils from the same site to this species.

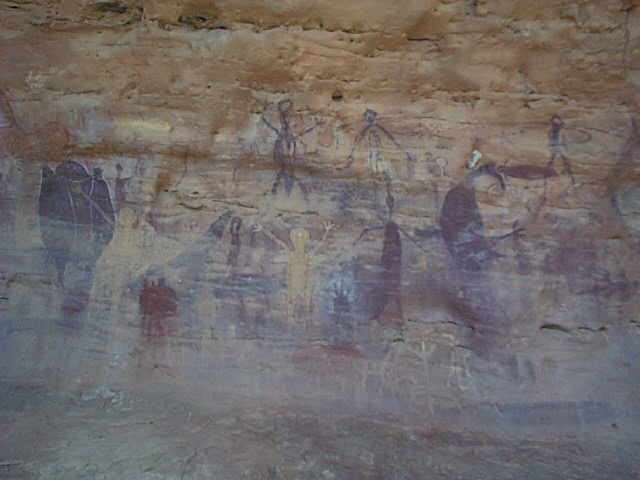
Quinkan rock art near Laura, Queensland. These spirits are the namesake of Quinkana.

Only two years later a third species of Quinkana, Quinkana babarra, was described, this time by Brian Mackness and Paul M.A. Willis. The holotype (QM F23220), a fragment of the maxilla, was uncovered in 1991 by Mackness at the Dick's Mother Lode Quarry in the Charters Towers Region of northeast Queensland, a locality that would have been intermediate in time between those of the two previously named taxa. However, Quinkana babarra proved to be much more fragmentary than either of the two established species. Partly for this reason, the diagnosis that had been established by previous works for Quinkana was altered the most significantly by Willis and Mackness, removing features such as the prominent knobs before the eyes as they are not preserved in their taxon. The final species to be named was Quinkana meboldi, discovered the same year as Quinkana babarra by Willis. It was described only a year later in 1997 on the basis of multiple maxillary fragments and a partial dentary alongside multiple other mekosuchines from the White Hunter Site of the Riversleigh World Heritage Area, namely Baru wickeni, "Baru" huberi and Mekosuchus whitehunterensis.

After these early descriptions, things became relatively quiet in terms of fossil material, with far fewer notable discoveries being made. During this period the ecology and habits of Quinkana gained more attention, with repeated debate on its role in Australia's prehistoric ecosystems and whether or not it was terrestrial. Among the more notable later finds was the discovery of a ziphodont tooth in the Late Pleistocene King Creek catchment of the eastern Darling Downs, an otherwise well sampled locality known for its abundant material of Megalania. This marked the first Late Pleistocene Quinkana material of the region since the teeth mentioned by Molnar in 1981.

=== Etymology ===
Its generic name was derived from the Quinkans, a type of spirit of the Northern Queensland aboriginal Gugu-Yalanji people. Molnar explains that part of the reason for this choice in name was that Quinkans were represented by crocodiles in at least one instance at a southeastern Cape York rock painting location. However, it has been noted that though the Quinkans serve as inspiration for the name, no rock art from Australia is actually inferred to depict any mekosuchines, but usually inferred to show the two modern Australian crocodile species.

== Species ==
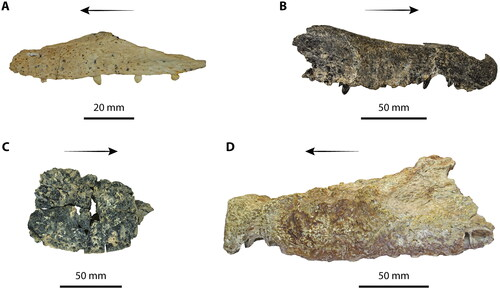
The holotype specimens of the four Quinkana species. Q. meboldi (a), Q. timara (b), Q. babarra (c) and Q. fortirostrum (d) were all described from skull remains of varying quality.

- Quinkana fortirostrum

The type species of the genus, Q. fortirostrum was described in 1981 by Ralph Molnar based on a partial skull collected from middle Pleistocene cave deposits in Queensland. While the genus as a whole is best known for its ziphodont teeth, they are only inferred for the holotype, as the actual fossil did not preserve with any teeth still in their sockets. The species name was based on the Latin words "fortis" and "rostrum" meaning "strong" and "beak" (in reference to the species' snout) respectively.

- Quinkana timara

The second species of Quinkana to be named, Q. timara is known from the Bullock Creek Locality near Camfield Station in Australia's Northern Territory, dating to the middle to late Miocene. Q. timara is known from a lot more material than the other species, with the type material consisting of a partial snout and the antorbital region of what was likely the same specimen, both collected from the so called "Blast Site". The same locality also yielded additional maxillary fragments, teeth and lower jaw fossils, with more fragmentary material also being collected from other localities within the Camfield Beds. The species was defined as having a "narrower snout" and "proportionally larger antorbital shelf [opening in the skull]" than Q. fortirostrum. This distinction is reflected in the name timara, which are thin Quinkans or "spirits" in the culture of the Gugu-Yalanji.

- Quinkana babarra

Named in 1996, this species is known from the early Pliocene Allingham Formation of Queensland but only preserved through a fragment of the maxilla and a few isolated teeth. Q. babarra can be differentiated from Q. fortirostrum and Q. timara by likely having a wider and shorter snout. The name is derived from the Gugu-Yalanji word babarr meaning "older sister" in reference to it being older than the type species.

- Quinkana meboldi

This species was found at the White Hunter Site in Riversleigh, northwestern Queensland which is a late Oligocene deposit (ca. 25 Ma), making it the oldest species of Quinkana described. It was described based on multiple fossils of the maxilla as well as a partial lower jaw. As the oldest species, Quinkana meboldi appears to lack several key features that are characteristic for more recent members of the genus. In addition to being much more slender-snouted than Quinkana fortirostrum, Quinkana meboldi had partially interlocking teeth that lacked serrations, meaning it was the only species within the genus to not be ziphodont. It is generally regarded as being among the smaller species of Quinkana. The species was named after Ulrich Mebold, a German astronomer of the Max Planck Institute for Radio Astronomy.

A big issue with much of this material is how fragmentary it is. With these finds often being isolated bones or even just incomplete teeth, the lack of overlap and distinguishing features means that most of them cannot be assigned to any particular species of Quinkana, though sometimes the number of serrations on the teeth or the age of the fossils give hints at what taxon they could have belonged to. Additional fossil specimens not assigned to any of the four species include a partial maxilla including two teeth (QM F10771) found at the Glen Garland Station in Yarraden, northwestern Queensland, which exhibits alveoli similar to those of Quinkana babarra, but is too fragmentary to be attributed with certainty. A late Pleistocene tooth (QM F57032) was found in 2013 in the Kings Creek site of southeastern Queensland and shares similarities with teeth traditionally assigned to Quinkana fortirostrum, though the holotype of said species is actually toothless. Teeth are also known from a multitude of other localities.

Sometimes the material also differs significantly enough to suggest the presence of as of yet unnamed species or even entirely new genera. For example, in 1997 Paul Willis mentioned a ziphodont crocodilian from the Ongeva Local Fauna of the Alcoota Fossil Site that has yet to be named. A small terrestrial mekosuchine from the middle Pleistocene Mt. Etna caves system is mentioned by Sobbe and colleagues and several isolated ziphodont teeth have been discovered in the Otibanda Formation of Papua New Guinea. In the case of the Otibanda finds, the material is currently only identified as ?Mekosuchinae gen. et sp. indet. because the material is too isolated to make any specific taxonomic assignments. Even the assignment to Mekosuchinae is not based on morphology, but rather on the age and geography. Another notable discovery is the "Floraville taxon", which according to Jorgo Ristevski and colleagues could represent a second ziphodont genus in addition to Quinkana. Given the large quantity of ziphodont crocodilians likely to be distinct from Quinkana, Ristevski and colleagues have argued that many isolated teeth traditionally referred to the Quinkana could also belong to these other forms.

A metatarsal bone (QM F30566) was found in 1992 in the Bluff Downs fossil site near Allingham in northern Queensland. This specimen could represent a rare limb element, but it is just as possible that it belonged to a different type of crocodilian altogether. Mackness and Sutton, who described the material, tentatively argue that it did not belong to Quinkana babarra on account of the taxon's inferred terrestrial habits, though this is still under debate. Another instance of possible postcranial material is noted in Stein et al. 2017, who describe pelvic material from the Golden Steph Site and Price is Right Site of the Riversleigh WHA. Though much like with the metatarsal there is no associated skull material to confirm the fossils actually belonged to Quinkana, the terrestrial adaptations suggested by the anatomy of the material would match what is commonly inferred for the genus.

== Description ==
Quinkana is best distinguished from other mekosuchines by the proportions of its snout and its highly specialised dentition, both of which are oftentimes cited as evidence for a more terrestrial lifestyle. The snout of Q. fortirostrum is noticeably deep and angular, its proportions somewhat resembling much older fossil crocodylomorphs such as the planocraniids that existed during the Paleogene across the Northern Hemisphere and the sebecosuchians that were primarily found in South America from the Cretaceous to the Miocene. Molnar describes the skull of Q. fortirostrum as being broader than that of members of the aforementioned groups, yet also distinctly deeper (higher) than those of any modern crocodilians with a distinct trapezoid cross-section. The specific proportions did however vary among species of this genus, as Q. timara, an older form from the Miocene, had noticeably more slender jaws that most closely resemble those of Boverisuchus in proportions. Q. meboldi had similarly narrower jaws while yet another species, Q. babarra, has been described as having had a shorter and broader snout than even the Pleistocene Q. fortirostrum.

The nares of Quinkana, unlike those of sebecosuchians, still closely resemble those of modern crocodilians in that they share a singular opening that is directed anterodorsally (towards the front and up) rather than fully to the sides. However, there are still differences, namely that in Quinkana they are located very close to the tip of the premaxilla and are deeply notched, which especially in Quinkana timara gives them more exposure towards the side of the skull than in today's crocodilians. The nares are further surrounded by a ring of bone, referred to as the narial rim, that is only weakly developed in Q. timara and very prominent in Q. fortirostrum. The premaxillae form a small peg that inserts itself between the maxillae and the nasal bones. The nasals themselves are similar to those of other mekosuchines, being paired, parallel elements with tapering ends. The nasals enter the nares and, based on Q. timara, do not form an internarial bridge that would divide the nares. Looking at them in profile view, the nasals are slightly arched and heavily sculpted, but located entirely on the dorsal surface of the skull. This differentiates Quinkana from sebecosuchians, in which the nasals contribute to the sides of the skull and form a median crest. The maxillae are steep, which gives the skull of Quinkana its altirostral (deep) appearance. Towards the front they incline at a 60° angle, whereas further towards the back the skull becomes wider and the maxillae only incline at an angle of 45°. The surface of the maxillae is only slightly sculptured.

The lacrimal and prefrontal bone, two elements located before the eyes, are highly affected by the angular shape of Quinkana's skull. While the former contributes to the side of the skull, the latter is located entirely on the dorsal surface much like the nasals. The shape of the lacrimal further indicates that Quinkana had eyes that faced sideways rather than up, a hallmark of more terrestrial crocodylomorphs. While the region below the eyes is poorly preserved in Q. fortirostrum, there are still several aspects that can be inferred for it and other species provide additional information. Initially, Molnar described the jugal bone as not extending in front of the orbits, a claim later refuted by Megirian. Not only does the jugal extend in front of the eyes in Q. timara, but it also does in the Texas Caves cranium assigned to the genus by Molnar. Willis and Mackness also discuss the matter, arguing that the fact that the contact between maxilla and jugal on the inner side of the skull sits before the eyes means the external suture must have been located even further to the front. A feature of the jugal consistently highlighted is that the lower (ventral) side of the jugal was covered in a distinct sculptured area similar to that seen in today's American alligator. Furthermore, the depth the maxilla still displays in this region indicates that the infraorbital bar, the region between the lower margin of the eye sockets and the bottom of the cranium, was much deeper than is typical. The postorbital bar, a bony peg behind the eyes that connects the jugal to the skull table, is noted to be much more vertical than in taxa with flattened skulls. This would suggest that the skull table would somewhat overhang the temporal region.

The skull of Quinkana is covered by a variety of highly distinct ridges, knobs and other protrusions. In addition to the narial rim surrounding the animal's nostrils and the highly sculpted nasal bone, some species of Quinkana also feature a distinct crest located across the maxilla and sometimes premaxilla. The skull of Q. fortirostrum has a rounded crest which extends along both bones, whereas in Q. timara the crest was restricted entirely to the former. Q. babarra meanwhile was noted to not have had a full crest but rather multiple isolated peaks, the largest of which corresponding to the end of the crest in Q. fortirostrum. More ridges can be found where the maxilla transitions from its lateral (sideways facing) to its dorsal surface. Finally, both the lacrimal and prefrontal of Quinkana fortirostrum have well-developed knobs where other crocodilians sometimes have ridges. This is unique to Quinkana, which specifically possessed two such knobs located on the lacrimal and a single knob on the prefrontal. These features are not exclusive to Quinkana fortirostrum, but can also be observed in the older species, if not as pronounced as in the Pleistocene form. Megirian hypothesizes that age could be a factor in this, with the features changing as the individual grows older. Similar to the ridges, Quinkana has a highly distinct antorbital shelf, a flattened region located just before the eyes on the dorsal surface of the cranium. This shelf is proportionally larger in Quinkana timara when compared to the other species.

The bottom of the maxilla is slightly convex and does not display the same pattern of wave-like rises and drops (known as festooning) that is seen in many other crocodilians. The lack of vertical festooning is especially prominent in Q. fortirostrum, in which the toothrow is nearly straight, though slightly more developed in the older Q. timara. Lateral festooning was likewise not well developed, which means that when viewed from above skulls of Quinkana did not have the sinuous outline like other crocodilians, which is marked by the presence of multiple constrictions and expansions of the maxillae. The only notch present in Quinkana is the one separating the maxillae and premaxillae. The most prominent festooning in Quinkana is expressed in Q. babarra and Q. meboldi, however even in these species the condition is barely present.

Several more features of the skull are only visible when looking at it from below, in ventral view. For instance, the ventral contact between premaxilla and maxilla is U-shape and the incisive foramen is wider than it is long. Other major differences to other crocodilians can be seen in regards to the palatines and palatal fenestrae. Although only very little of the actual palatines is known in Q. fortirostrum, the area where they contact the maxilla indicates that this species lacked the elongated anterior process that the palatines form in many other crocodiles like the saltwater crocodile. Instead of extending beyond the fenestrae and forming a large, lobate structure, the palatines in Q. fortirostrum seem to end between the fenestrae where they contact the maxilla via a V-shaped suture. This section is so small that Molnar initially described Quinkana as lacking an anterior process altogether, whereas Megirian described the palatine process of both Q. fortirostrum and Q. timara as simply having been small. Similarly, the palatal process of Q. meboldi was also shown to be short. In this way they more closely resemble the palatines of dwarf crocodiles and false gharials, although in the former the bones still take on a lobate form. The front of the palatal fenestrae coincide with the anterior wall of the pterygoid fossae, forming a partition located above the fenestrae and giving them a more rounded shape. By contrast, the fossae extend much further forward in modern Australasian crocodiles, giving their palatal fenestrae a more sharp ending. As the palatines contribute to this wall, it is described as a "folding of the palatine" by Dirk Megirian. Overall, the palatal fenestrae extend until the fifth or sixth maxillary alveoli in Q. babarra, the seventh in Q. fortirostrum and the eight in Q. timara and Q. meboldi.

Internally, the skull of Quinkana featured so called "lateral chambers", which are also seen in other crocodilians. However, most likely because of the increased depth of the skull, the lateral chambers of Quinkana are much more prominent than in animals like the saltwater crocodile and extend into the space between the palate and the nasal passage. In contrast to this, the lateral chambers and nasal passage of modern saltwater crocodiles are confluent with another.

Few lower jaws are known, but fossil material referred to Quinkana timara indicates that the mandibular symphysis, the fused section at the tip of the lower jaw, extended back until the sixth dentary tooth. A dentary piece has also been assigned to Q. meboldi based on the fact that it lacked festooning and features laterally compressed teeth identical to those of the upper jaw.

=== Dentition ===
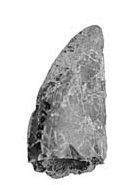
An unattributed Quinkana tooth.

Quinkana fortirostrum preserves four teeth in either premaxilla, though a fifth is possible, all of them situated in an alveolar process, with the last two showing the elongated form typical for this genus. However, the third to last toothsocket appears to have been almost circular in cross-section. A prominent pit lies between the first tooth and the incisive foramen. A further 12 tooth sockets are preserved in the maxilla of Q. fortirostrum, much resembling the posterior alveoli of the premaxilla in their elongated form. In Q. fortirostrum and Q. timara, reception pits for the teeth of the lower jaw are located medially relative to the teeth of the premaxilla and maxilla, indicating that this animal had an overbite that clearly sets it apart from the interlocking teeth of modern crocodiles and the older Q. meboldi. An exception to this is posed by the fourth dentary tooth, which slides neatly into a marked notch located at the premaxillary-maxillary contact. Like in many other mekosuchines, there is a distinct size disparity among the teeth, some of which are noticeably larger than others. The teeth towards the front of the jaw tend to be much taller, but are short anteroposteriorly (from the front to the back), whereas the teeth further back are lower but longer horizontally.

In the type description of Quinkana it is noted that the elongated alveoli likely correspond to teeth that are compressed laterally (side to side). Though only inferred for the holotype, other specimens of Quinkana clearly show that this was the case and that the teeth were furthermore serrated, making them ziphodont. Ziphodont teeth are characterized by two things, lateral compression that gives them a blade-like appearance and a series of serrations. Though several other mekosuchines do have laterally flattened teeth and some minor crenulations, such as Baru, only those of Quinkana are considered to be truly ziphodont. Another feature of the teeth of some Quinkana species is that they are somewhat inclined to the sides of the maxilla which is visible from different angles. In Quinkana fortirostrum for example this orientation is best observed ventrolaterally, meaning the inclination is most obvious when looking at the bottom of the skull from a slight angle. However, unlike in Q. fortirostrum and Q. timara with their oblique tooth orientation, the axis of the teeth in Q. babarra fall in line with each other.

The development of the serrations differs among species. Quinkana timara had finely serrated teeth, with Megirian observing around seven to ten serrations per millimeter, twice as many as are recorded for the indeterminate Pleistocene form from Croydon. The amount of serrations remains unknown in Q. fortirostrum on account of the type specimen not preserving teeth, but Pleistocene teeth generally appear less finely serrated than those of Q. timara. Overall, the amount of serrations bears similarities to the range observed in planocraniids, with specimens of Boverisuchus vorax possessing around six serrations per millimeter, while specimens of B. magnifrons range from five to eight serrations based on individuals from France and seven to nine serrations based on specimen collected from the Messel Pit. Q. babarra meanwhile seems to have had both serrated and unserrated teeth at the same time while Q. meboldi, the oldest species, lacked serrations on its carinae altogether. Q. meboldi further stands out from other species in the fact that its teeth do not form an overbite and instead partially interlock more akin to those of modern crocodiles.

Both Q. fortirostrum and Q. timara are known to have had four to five premaxillary teeth and a further 12 in either maxilla. However, as the skulls of both are incomplete, it cannot be ruled out that they also had a 13th maxillary tooth. Initially, this notion was rejected for Q. fortirostrum on account of the narrowing maxilla, however as Megirian points out the lack of space for an additional tooth could have been compensated for by the ectopterygoid bone. The tooth count for Q. babarra is unknown given its fragmentary nature, but Q. meboldi is known to have had a minimum of 14 maxillary teeth, setting it apart from the younger species.

The dentary teeth are poorly understood given the general lack of lower jaw material, but what little is known shows the same overall pattern as those of the upper jaw, with elongated and compressed alveoli.

=== Size ===
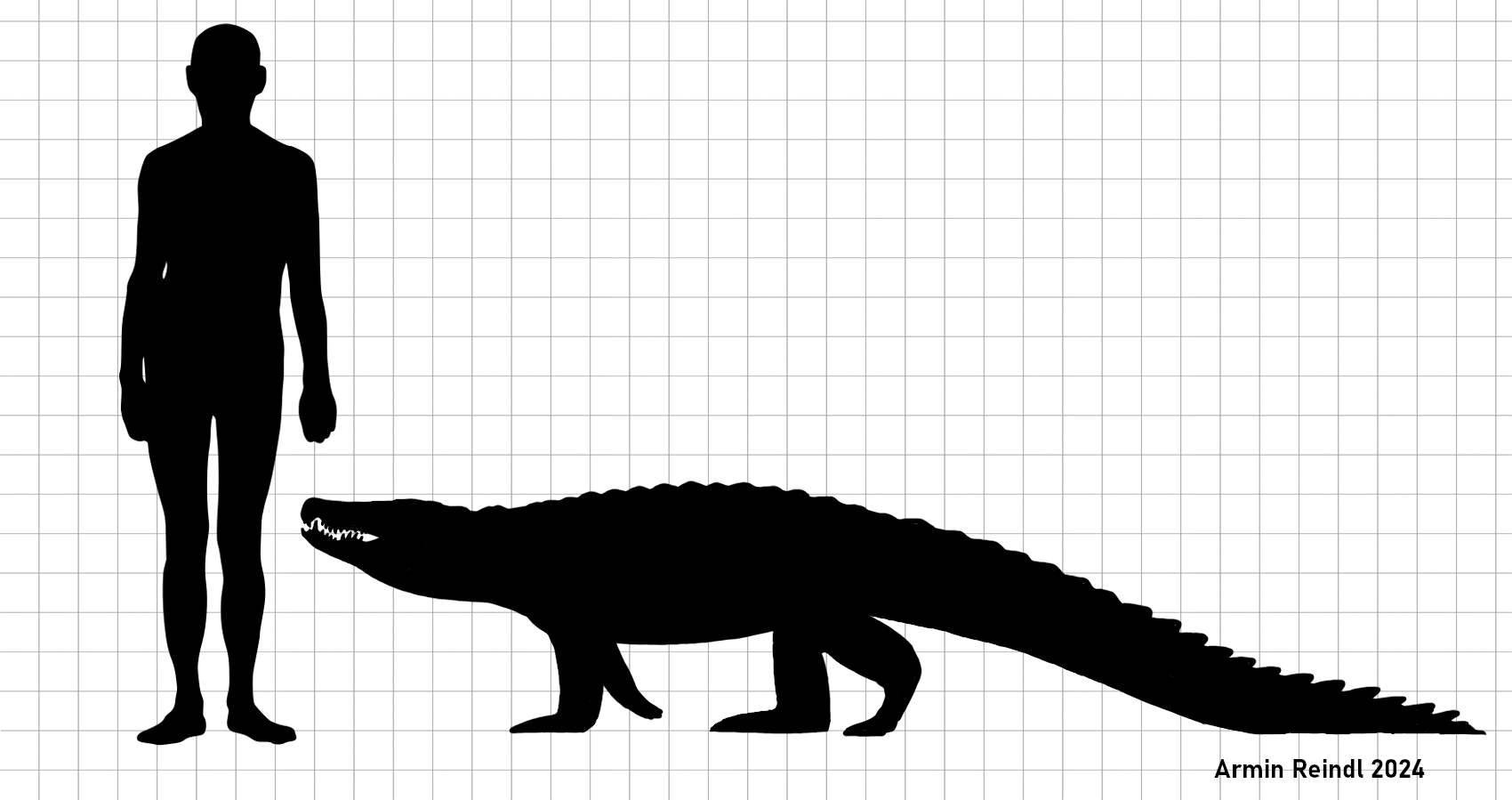
Size comparison of Quinkana fortirostrum after Flannery (1990) and Sobbe (2013)

The precise size reached by species of the genus Quinkana is a matter of debate, but generally hard to determine both due to the absence of significant postcranial remains and the fragmentary nature of most known material. Willis and Mackness suggest that the holotype of Q. babarra was slightly smaller than both the holotype of Q. fortirostrum and that of Q. timara, suggesting that the two were of somewhat similar size despite the fact that the former was proportionally much more robust. Q. meboldi is generally considered to be the smallest of the four species, being described as small to moderately sized by Willis.

Quinkana fortirostrum is estimated to have reached a body length of approximately 3 m (9.8 ft) by both Flannery and Webb, who further calculate a body mass of over 200 kg (440 lb). However, Wroe notes that neither researcher specifies if said estimates are the maximum length or averages while also arguing that the weight appears to have been an overestimate based on the mass of saltwater crocodiles of equal length. Regardless, 3 meters is still considered to be a reasonable estimate for the larger Quinkana species. Quinkana meboldi meanwhile is thought to have measured less than half that length, with Wroe providing an estimate of less than 1.5 m (4 ft 11 in) following personal communication with Willis. There is one single bone fragment that could suggest a greater size, with Salisbury and Molnar mentioning a fragment of a lower jaw that could suggest an individual between 6–7 m (20–23 ft) meters long. However, information on this specimen is sparse, as it is not only fragmentary but only discussed in a singular abstract before being mentioned by Molnar in his 2004 book Dragons in the Dust.

== Phylogeny ==
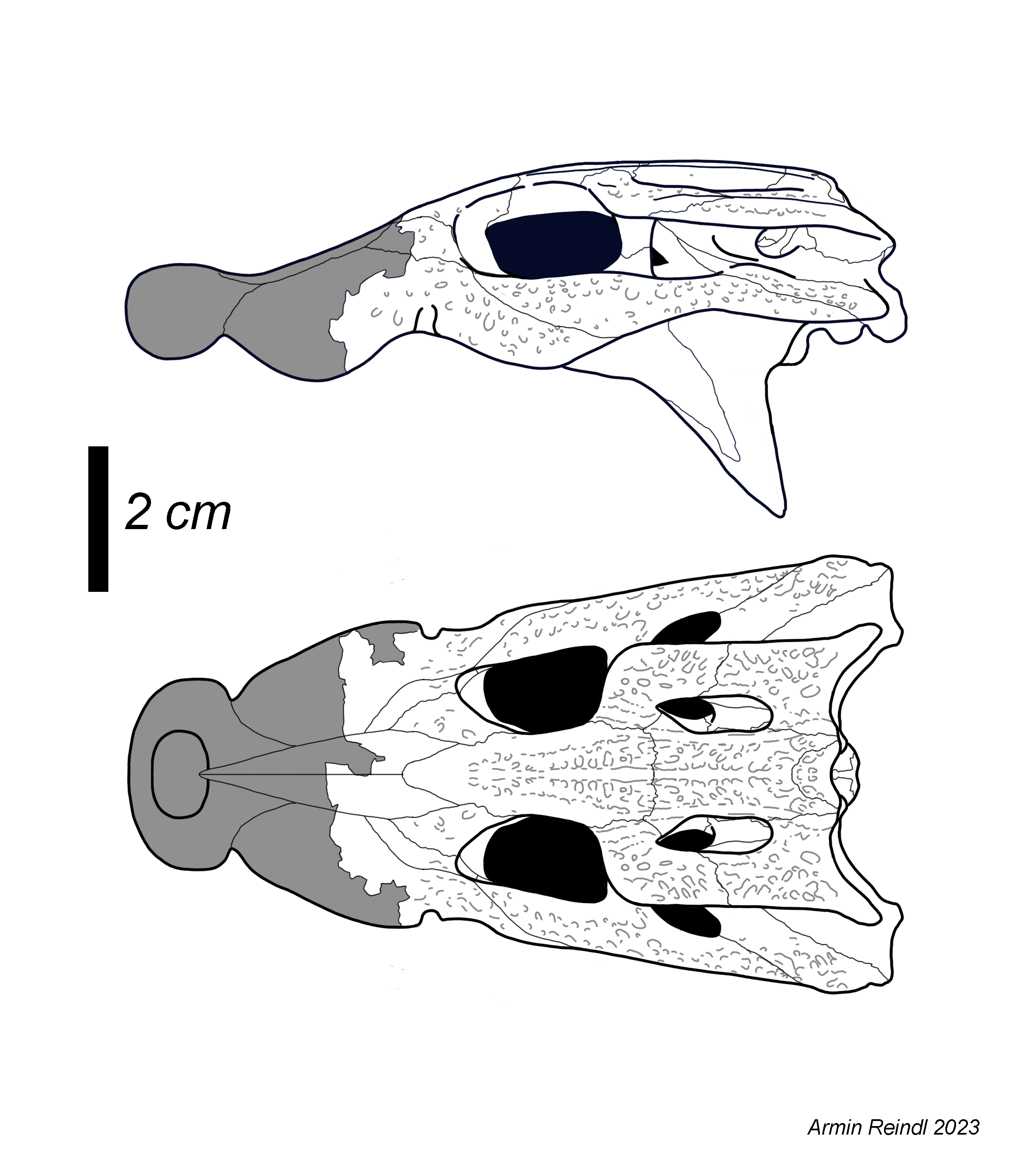
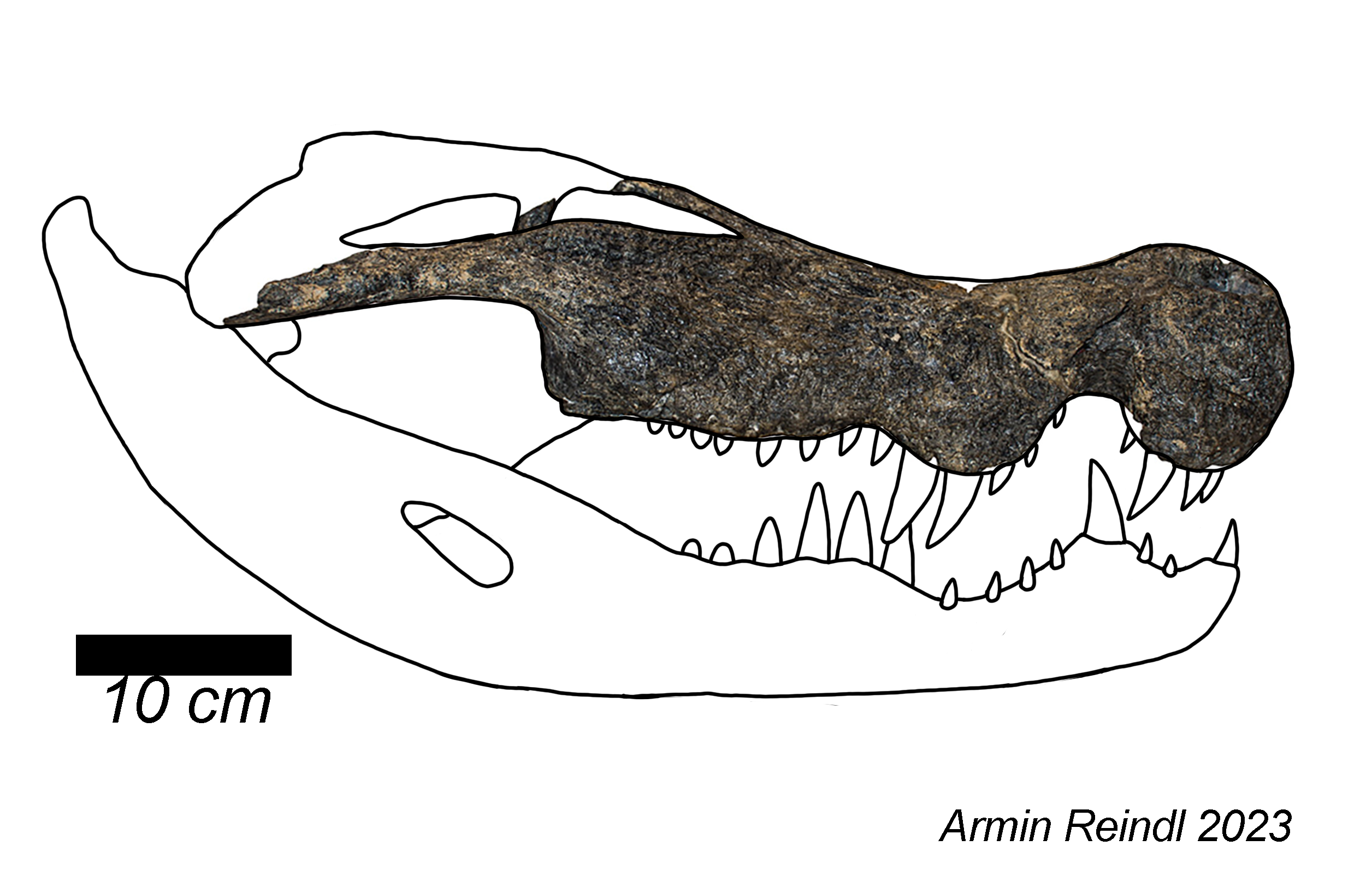
The position of Quinkana within Mekosuchinae is uncertain, but it may be related to either small terrestrial forms like Trilophosuchus or large semi-aquatic taxa like Baru.

Given that Quinkana predates most of the research done on the Mekosuchinae, early research was uncertain about its relationship to other crocodilians. The type species Q. fortirostrum was originally classified under Crocodylidae in 1981 through comparison against other Eusuchian genera Pristichampsus, Paleosuchus, and Osteolaemus and against the sebecosuchian genus Sebecus. The most similarities were found with Pristichampsus and it was determined that the genus should fall under Eusuchia, whereas similarities to Sebecus were dismissed as the result of convergently acquiring the ziphodont condition. At the same time, the snout form and ziphodont dentition clearly set apart Quinkana from most other crocodilians with the exception of members of the Pristichampsinae. Though Molnar did not definitively assign the genus to said family (which has since then been changed to Planocraniidae), he argued that future discoveries were likely to confirm his suspicion that Quinkana was related to these Paleogene animals.

However, around the late 80s and early 90s researchers began to discover more and more fossil crocodilians from Australia, slowly beginning to recognize various shared features among them. The subfamily Mekosuchinae was proposed in 1993 by Molnar, Willis, and Professor John Scanlon to define this growing number of Australian crocodilian genera. It was designed to accommodate Quinkana and other genera which demonstrated unique characteristics and were native to Australasia during the Cenozoic. The Mekosuchinae classification was contrasted in the 1994 description of Q. timara, in which Dirk Megirian suggested that further research into the phylogeny of Pristichampsus and Quinkana was necessary because of the similarities in the snout when compared to other Crocodylidae. However, at the time of Megirian's writing he was unaware of the work by Molnar, Willis and Scanlon, only briefly addressing the existence of Mekosuchinae in a note added later on. Willis doubled down on the assignment of Quinkana to the Mekosuchinae with a 1995 publication, once again confirming the validity of this grouping despite the fact that Quinkana was the only taxon in the family with ziphodont teeth.

Since then, the interpretation of Quinkana as a mekosuchine has prevailed as the dominant interpretation, especially as the family expanded more and more thanks to new fossil discoveries. However, the precise position of Quinkana within Mekosuchinae is still not fully resolved and has undergone various incarnations. In a 2018 tip dating study by Lee & Yates, morphological, molecular (DNA sequencing), and stratigraphic (fossil age) data were used simultaneously to established the inter-relationships within Crocodylia. Below, the left cladogram shows the placement of Quinkana within Mekosuchinae according to their study, placing it as a derived member of the group most closely related to small dwarf forms such as Mekosuchus and Trilophosuchus. Another study headed by Jorgo Ristevski, the results of which are shown on the right, found results that differed significantly, suggesting that Quinkana was in fact not related to these other terrestrial forms, but instead most closely allied to large-bodied generalists like Paludirex and Baru. Yet another alternative was recovered by Yates and colleagues in their description of Baru iylwenpeny, which positioned Quinkana between Kalthifrons and a clade composed of Mekosuchus, Paludirex and Baru.

- - Mekosuchinae
    - Australosuchus†
    - - - Kambara taraina†
        - Kambara implexidens†
      - - Kambara murgonensis†
        - - - - Kalthifrons†
              - Pallimnarchus†
            - - Baru wickeni†
              - - Baru darrowi†
                - Baru Alcoota†
          - - - Bullock Creek taxon†
              - "Baru" huberi†
            - - Volia†
              - - Mekosuchus†
                - - Trilophosuchus†
                  - Quinkana†
  - Longirostres

- - Crocodyloidea
    - "Crocodylus" megarhinus†
    - - Mekosuchinae
        - Kalthifrons aurivellensis†
        - - - Kambara spp.†
          - - Australosuchus clarkae†
            - - - "Baru" huberi†
                - - Trilophosuchus rackhami†
                  - - Volia athollandersoni†
                    - - Mekosuchus whitehunterensis†
                      - - Mekosuchus sanderi†
                        - Mekosuchus inexpectatus†
              - - Paludirex spp.†
                - - Baru spp.†
                  - - Quinkana meboldi†
                    - - Quinkana timara†
                      - Quinkana fortirostrum†
      - Crocodylidae

Though the position of Quinkana as a mekosuchine is generally accepted as consensus, some research has proposed an alternative placement outside of the clade. In 2021, Rio and Mannion published a paper on the phylogeny of crocodilians utilizing a new dataset based purely on morphological traits, in contrast to the work of Lee and Yates which unified various different fields for their phylogenies. While the majority of Mekosuchinae remains intact, this resulted in some taxa as being recovered much closer to today's crocodiles. In addition to Australosuchus, this also affected Quinkana, which nested closely to "Crocodylus" megarhinus just outside of the genus Crocodylus. However, these results are generally not followed by mekosuchine researchers.

- - - - Kambara implexidens
      - - Kambara taraina
        - - Kambara murgonensis
          - "Asiatosuchus" nanlingensis
    - - - Baru darrowi
        - Baru wickeni
      - - "Baru" huberi
        - - Trilophosuchus rackhami
          - - Ultrastenos willisi
            - Mekosuchus whitehunterensis
            - Mekosuchus sanderi
            - Mekosuchus inexpectatus
  - - Australosuchus clarkae
    - Crocodylidae
      - Osteolaeminae
      - Crocodylinae
        - - Quinkana
          - "Crocodylus" megarhinus
        - Crocodylus

== Paleobiology ==
The ecology and lifestyle of Quinkana has long been a matter of debate as far back as the type description by Molnar, who lists several points in favour of terrestrial habits while also highlighting potential counterarguments. For instance, the discovery of the holotype of Q. fortirostrum in cave deposits is assumed by him to be a strong indicator that the animal traveled over land before falling to its death, but at the same time Molnar highlights that even modern crocodilians will occasionally travel distances over land. Likewise, the depositional environment does not give any clear evidence for terrestrial habits either. Many of the localities that yielded Quinkana remains show a mix of terrestrial and semi-aquatic fauna, as is the case for the deposits that yielded the fossil remains of unambiguously terrestrial crocodylomorphs elsewhere in the world. The same issue is later also acknowledged by Busbey in 1986 and by Willis and Mackness in 1996, with both favoring a terrestrial lifestyle.

Much more important than the circumstances of the fossils preservation is the actual morphology of Quinkana. Ever since the description of the genus, it was noted that Quinkana closely resembles planocraniids, a group of terrestrial Eusuchians from the Paleogene of Europe. This group, which is known from much better material, is well established to have been one of the dominant terrestrial predators of their environment with several adaptations towards life on land that can also be seen in Quinkana. Among Quinkana species, Q. timara is perhaps the closest to planocraniids regarding its skull proportions, with Q. fortirostrum standing out as having a much wider head. How exactly this would influence its ecology is however also unknown. Similarly, the precise use of its ziphodont teeth, also shared by planocraniids and the older sebecosuchians, remains an issue with no clear answer. Molnar argues that the lateral compression and serrations are both signs that Quinkana went after larger prey than is typical for crocodilians. However, they are not an indicator for whether or not prey would be acquired in water or on land or whether the prey itself was terrestrial. Subsequently, Molnar highlights that it is just as possible that the teeth may have been used for preying on other crocodilians as it is possible that they were built to take down terrestrial prey. Busbey later argued that the ziphodont teeth of Quinkana were developed convergently to those of large, terrestrial predatory lizards such as the komodo dragon. Willis followed this idea, suggesting that large varanids and Quinkana may have taken down prey in a similar manner. Stein et al. also remark on this possibility, suggesting that ziphodont dentition could allow for cursorial hunting, allowing Quinkana to actively chase after its prey rather than having to ambush it as modern crocodiles tend to do, while Murray and Vickers-Rich propose that it could have still been an ambush predator, but doing so by waiting for prey near game trails rather than the shoreline.

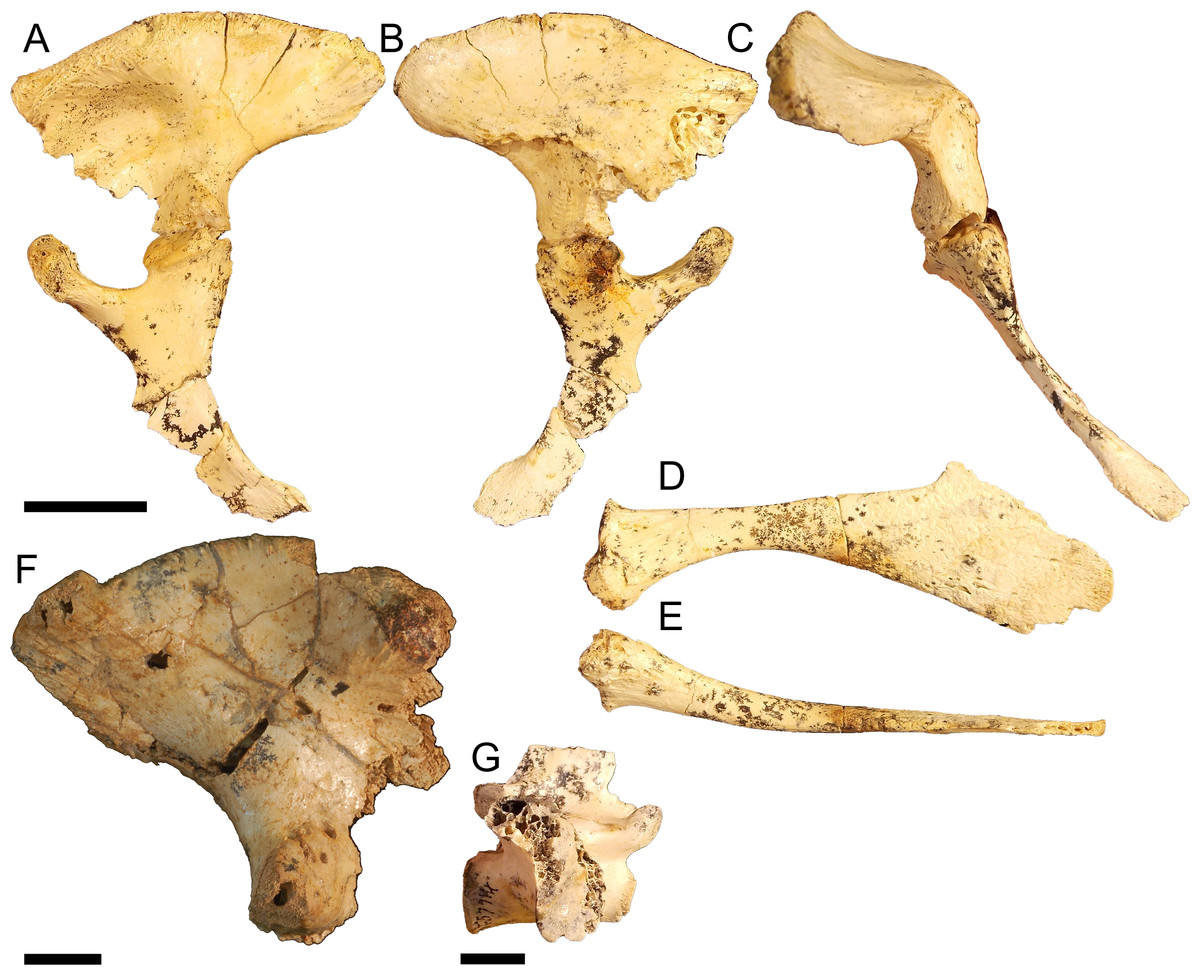
While no associated limb and skull fossils are known, pelvic form four suggest that at least one mekosuchine had a more upright posture and could therefore represent Quinkana.

While many of the questions raised by the skull anatomy could be solved by sufficient information regarding the postcranial skeleton, the issue with Quinkana is the lack of fossils representing the body or limbs. As discussed by Molnar, many extinct crocodylomorphs were in part determined to be terrestrial based on morphologic traits of the body, which in the case of planocraniids include hooflike toes and a tail with a round cross-section, rather than the flattened paddle-like tail seen in semi-aquatic crocodilians. While no postcranial remains reliably assigned to Quinkana are known, meaning that no such adaptations can be observed directly, there are other mekosuchines and undetermined remains that could suggest improved terrestrial locomotion relative to modern crocodilians. The Eocene Kambara for example represents not only the oldest, but also one of the basalmost and most complete mekosuchines currently known, being among the few with studied postcranial remains. Examinations of the limb bones of Kambara suggest that it was able to swing its legs with much greater force and that the anatomy of various elements gave it increased stability, greater speed and an increased stride length. While some of these adaptations give Kambara an improved ability to perform the so-called "highwalk", other parts of the skeleton do show that it was still a semi-aquatic animal. Another study dealing with the postcranial anatomy of mekosuchines was published by Stein and colleagues in 2017, specifically examining the shoulder girdle and hips of these animals based on fossils found across Australia. Among these fossils were various elements discovered in regions that also yielded remains of Quinkana, specifically the Riversleigh WHA. Four morphotypes are identified by the team, with "pelvic form four" having possibly belonged to Q. meboldi due to the highly derived state of the ilium and ischium, which differ greatly from "pelvic form one" (associated with Kambara) and "pelvic form three" (associated with Baru darrowi). "Pelvic form four" shows several aspects that are convergent with the hip of sebecosuchians and thus could have supported a pillar-erect stance while limiting a sprawling gait. Stein and colleagues note that this derived state, primarily achieved by the more enclosed acetabulum and expanded iliac crest, would match the cursorial habits and terrestrial lifestyle often inferred based on the cranial material. However, until more material showing a clear relation between this pelvic form and Quinkana skull material is found, it cannot be ruled out that the hip fossils belonged to a different mekosuchine.

One suggestion made by Molnar is that Quinkana, together with Megalania, could have been one of the dominant terrestrial predators of Pleistocene Australia, given the relative lack of large mammalian land predators compared to other continents. This had become a popular hypothesis during the later part of the 20th century, proposing that Australia's top predators primarily consisted of reptiles such as mekosuchines, giant varanids and madtsoiid snakes rather than marsupial predators, with Max Hecht arguing that animals such as Thylacoleo couldn't have filled the same niche as big cats. A similar sentiment was echoed by Sobbe, Price and Knezour, who proposed that Australia underwent a "taxonomic-ecological shift". They suggest that while the ecosystems of Miocene Australia were dominated by marsupial predators first and foremost, Pliocene and Pleistocene environments seemingly favoured large-bodied reptilian hunters with fewer marsupial carnivores. However, the idea of a reptile-dominated Australia has been questioned by Stephen Wroe in a 2002 publication, casting doubt over the idea and arguing for the contrary, partially due to the apparent rarity of reptile remains compared to those of marsupials. The rarity of Quinkana has also been noted by other researchers. In addition to this, Wroe more generally argues against terrestrial habits in Quinkana. Examples used by Wroe include the hypothesis that the hooves of Boverisuchus are an artifact of preservation and that dwarf caimans are capable of raising their heads as has been inferred for certain mekosuchines. However, not all of Wroe's counterarguments hold up. Crocodilian specialist Christopher Brochu for example maintains that the hooves of planocraniids were an anatomical feature rather than the result of taphonomy, with members of said group still being considered to have been largely terrestrial. Naturally Wroe's writings also do not account for later discoveries regarding the pelvic adaptations of mekosuchines.

Terrestrial habits and proximity to water may not be mutually exclusive. Some researchers, including Willis and Wroe, have gone on to propose that though hunting on land, Quinkana may have retreated into the water for protection or thermoregulation or even reproduction. Though sceptical of the hypothesized terrestrial habits, Wroe in particular argues that even if more land-based than other crocodilians, Quinkana may have still needed freshwater in order to breed or cool off.

Ultimately, a terrestrial lifestyle has been favored by the majority of researchers, even if they generally acknowledge and highlight the limited information that can be extrapolated from skull material alone. Though more distantly related mekosuchines show that the group may have had improved terrestrial capabilities, with some indetermined remains all but confirming the existence of mekosuchines with erect, pillar-like limbs, the status of Quinkana remains uncertain until more material showcasing a clear link between said material and the diagnostic skulls can be found.

=== Paleoenvironment ===
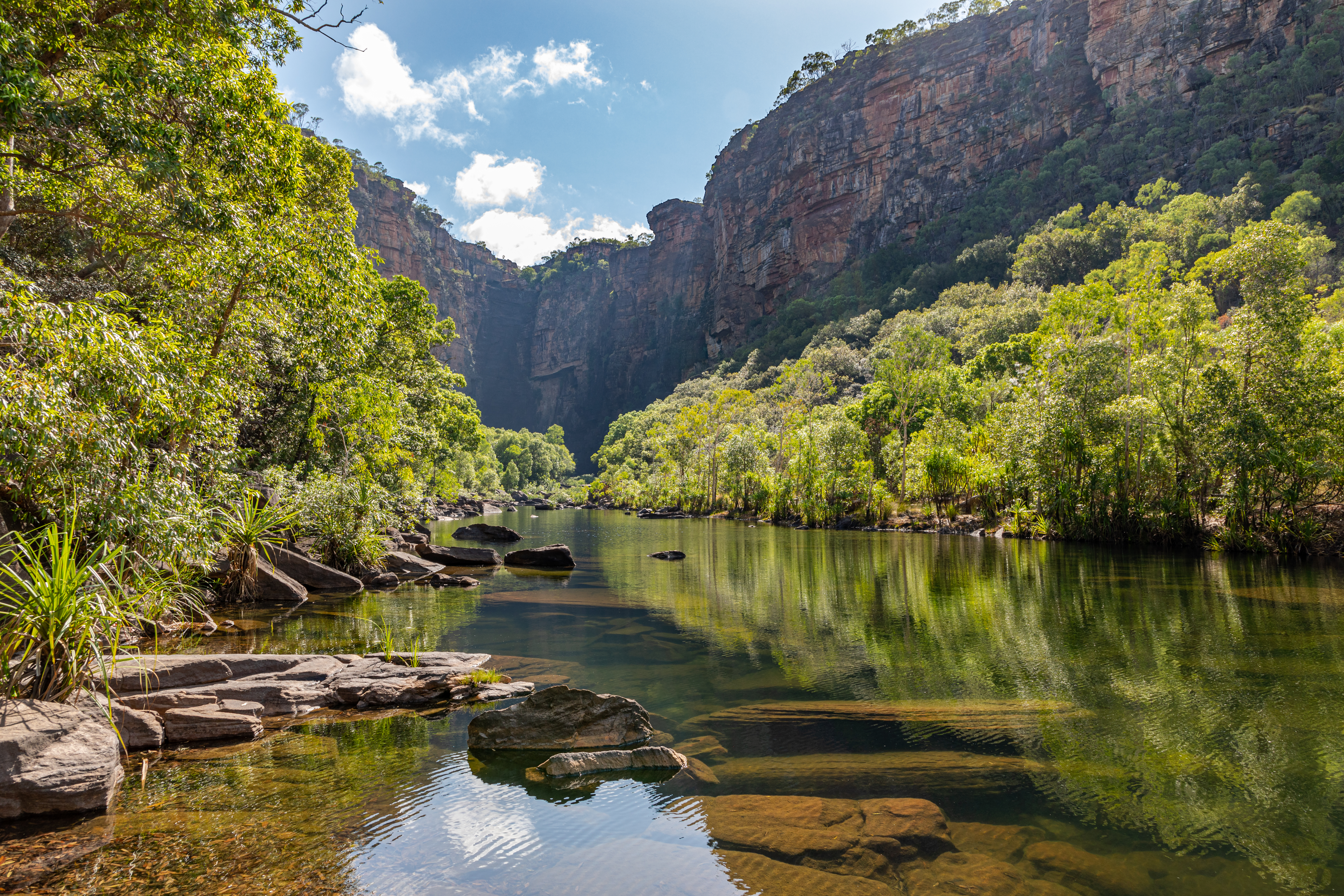
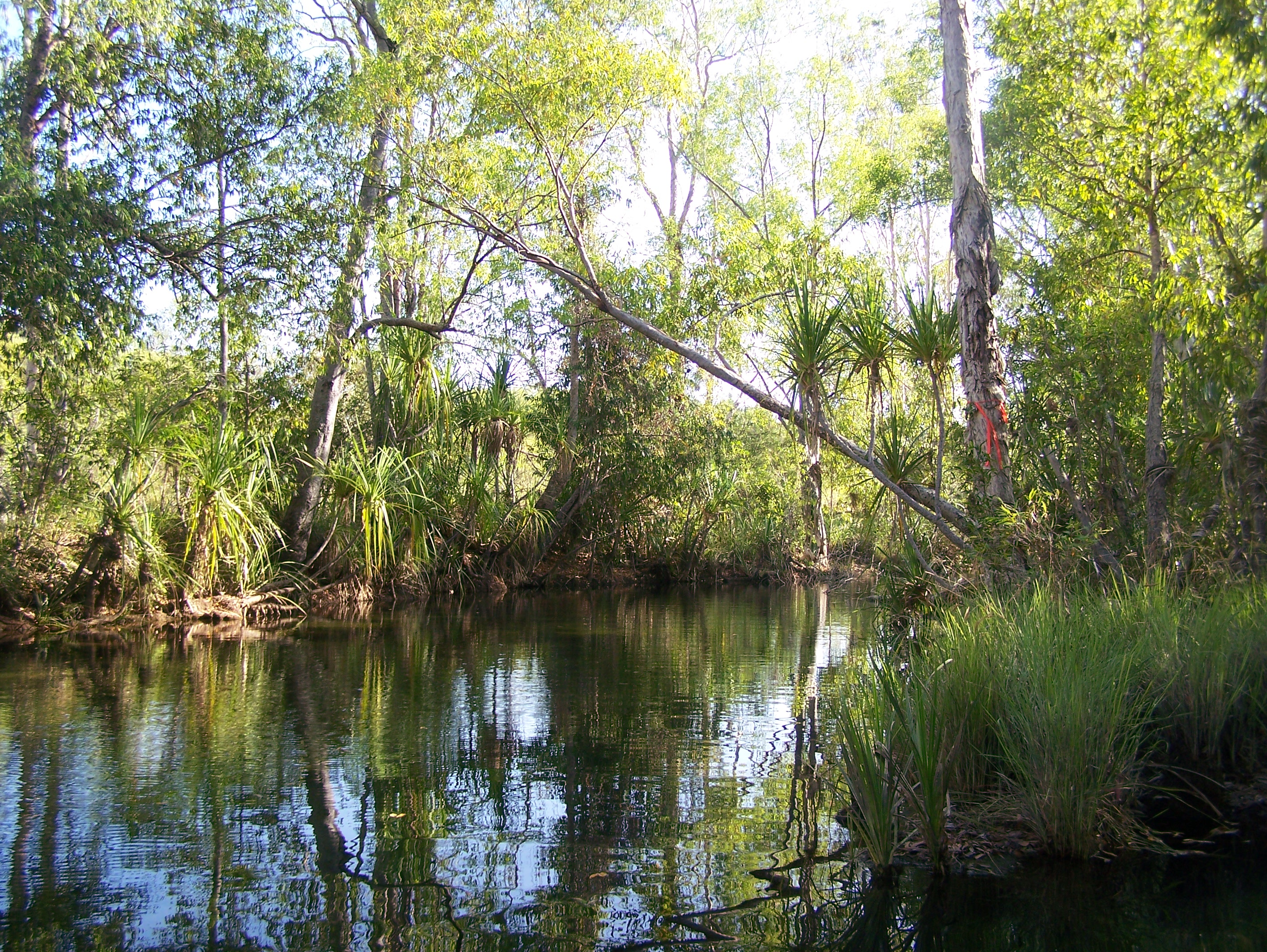
Quinkana may have preferred open woodlands in the vicinity of extensive bodies of freshwater, with some localities having been likened to today's Kakadu National Park

A somewhat consistent fact about the range of Quinkana is its proximity to other crocodilians with which it shared its habitat with. For example, Quinkana meboldi was found alongside three other crocodilians, the small terrestrial Mekosuchus whitehunterensis, the small semi-aquatic Ultrastenos and the large semi-aquatic Baru wickeni, each likely occupying a different niche in their environment. Although it has been proposed that this assemblage could have been the result of the carcasses of these animals being transported to a single location, research suggests that this was not the fact and that all the animals did in fact inhabit a single locality at the time they were alive. In this case, it was probably due to their different specialisation that so many crocodilians were capable of coexisting with each other.

The Bullock Creek Locality is thought to have once been covered by riparian woodlands as noted by Murray and Vickers-Rich, who describe the paleoenvironment as possibly having been a dry vine forest surrounded by scrubs and more open woodlands that covered the area surrounding the floodplains. This locality was also home to Baru darrowi, a semi-aquatic predator specialised in large prey, and the longirostine Harpacochampsa, which according to more recent research may have been a type of gharial. Both of these crocodilians may have preferred different habitats from one another and Quinkana, with Baru frequenting shallower waters and Harpacochampsa possibly living in slow moving waters like ponds and billabongs. While many of the prey animals at Bullock Creek do show signs of having been attacked by crocodilians, the more flattened punctures that would have been left by Quinkana's ziphodont teeth are noted to be much rarer than those of Baru.

During the Pliocene an undetermined species of Quinkana coexisted with Kalthifrons in the Lake Eyre Basin, specifically the Mampuwordu Sands. Q. babarra appeared in the Bluff Downs Local Fauna alongside an undetermined species of Crocodylus and a mekosuchine possibly referrable to Paludirex, while non-crocodilian predators include the marsupial Thylacoleo, giant snakes and large monitor lizards. The environment of this region has previously been suggested to have been similar to today's Kakadu National Park, featuring a well developed aquatic ecosystem surrounded by vine thickets and rainforest. Even more recent rock layers of the late Pliocene to middle Pleistocene saw Quinkana coexist with the gharial Gunggamarandu, both Paludirex vincenti and Paludirex gracilis, a possible third Paludirex species and an indeterminate species of Crocodylus.

At King Creek Quinkana is known to have coexisted with Megalania and a wide range of potential prey items including Protemnodon, Macropus titan and other kangaroos, Diprotodon and Troposodon, though it is noted that it was likely rare in eastern Queensland relative to other parts of Australia. Another Late Pleistocene river deposit, South Walker Creek in Western Queensland, recovered Quinkana material alongside 16 other species of megafauna, only three of which are still extant. While the herbivore fauna is composed of diprotodontids, kangaroos, palorchestids, wombats and the emu, carnivores are represented by Thylacoleo, two species of monitor lizards (including Megalania) and three crocodilians, once again showing how multiple members of the latter group seemingly coexisted alongside each other.

Overall, the range of Quinkana, whether it was terrestrial or not, appears to have been closely linked to freshwater systems, in particular those surrounded by riparian woodland and vine forests, typically sharing this environment with a plethora of other crocodilians. This would match the circumstances of its extinction as well, as researchers have noted that the disappearance of Quinkana coincides with an abrupt burst of aridification that lead to the drying of various river systems and the subsequent collapse of the local woodlands.

=== Extinction ===
In continental Australia, mekosuchines experienced two major waves of extinction, the first of which taking place sometime during the late Miocene and wiping out a number of genera including Baru. It has been suggested that these extinctions were the result of a short but severe burst or aridity that greatly affected the freshwater ecosystems of interior Australia. While this is thought to have prompted a major faunal turnover, with taxa such as Paludirex and Kalthifrons filling the niches of Baru and kin, this burst of aridification does not appear to have affected Quinkana greatly. Remains of this genus are found before and after the proposed late Miocene extinctions, which has been taken as potential evidence for its ecology differing significantly from the taxa that went extinct. However, conditions continued to deteriorate until the Pleistocene, this time also affecting Quinkana.

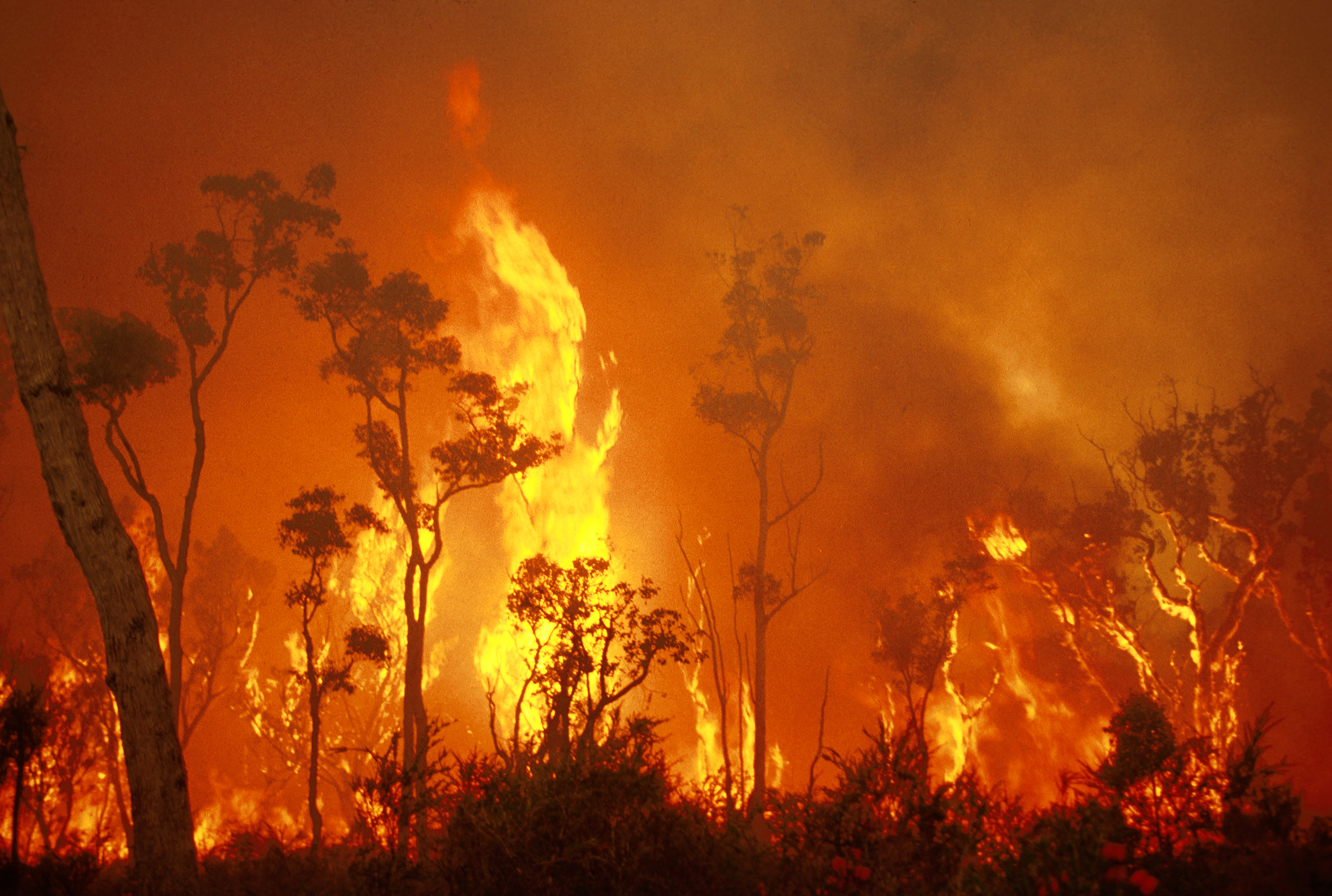
Aridification and an increase in forest fires are thought to have been the main factor for the extinction of Quinkana, but there is no evidence for human involvement.

Fossil evidence suggests that Quinkana survived until the Late Pleistocene, with records from that time including the isolated tooth of King Creek, dated to be around 122,000 years old, and the fossils recovered from the South Walker Creek site that have been dated to be from around 40,000 to 20,000 years ago. The fossil of the South Walker Creek site were given particular attention by Hocknull and colleagues in 2020, who studied the locality in an attempt to better understand the extinction of Megafauna in eastern Australia (then part of the continent Sahul). According to them, the hydroclimactic conditions began to deteriorate abruptly around 48,000 years ago in the Lake Eyre Basin, with the other river basins of eastern Australia following suit within the next eight thousand years. During this time the conditions fell below the levels seen today, marking a clear drop in rainfall and thus cutting off the water supply of the catchments. Though the hydroclimate returned to its former state sometime in the last 30,000 years, by then the hydrological flow had been altered beyond the point that the former freshwater systems could form again. The abrupt drying would have led to the local extinction of the crocodilians within the various inland basins, something that modern species of Crocodylus species might have avoided by retreating to coastal waters. The same study also analyzed possible changes in vegetation and fire frequency, which also show increased aridification and the collapse of complex rainforests beginning around 50,000 years ago. Charcoal particles further indicate that fires became more frequent around 44,000 years ago, which was only exacerbated by the decline of grazing megafauna and a reduction of the local grasslands. According to Hocknull and colleagues, the arrival of humans, though falling into the same time frame, was likely coincidental and not tied to the extinction of Quinkana, as the team argues that the extinction of Australia's megafauna runs in the opposite direction of what would be expected should humans have been the primary driver. Ristevski and colleagues similarly raise points against a rapid human-induced extinction, reasoning that such a "blitzkrieg" extirpation does not match the fact that humans and mekosuchines may have coexisted for around 40,000 years based on the remains found at South Walker Creek. The team does however point out that this does not necessarily preclude a more gradual human-influenced extinction, which may have involved habitat destruction via cultural burning. Records of this can be found as early as 41,600 years ago in the south of Australia and 11,000 years ago in the north, though there is no evidence that such burnings are actually tied to the extinction of Quinkana. While direct hunting and overhunting of prey items are possible, these hypotheses likewise lack backing in fossil evidence, with human-crocodile conflict in Australia only becoming apparent by the Holocene, possibly indicating that early arrivers avoided mekosuchines or that only later population growth lead to increased overlap between human and crocodile territory.

The idea that Quinkana was driven to extinction by the gradual drying of Australia, destroying forest habitats and freshwater systems, is also supported by other publications on the matter. Sobbe, Price and Knezour for example describe the process of aridification as destroying the closed woodlands and vine scrublands that previously covered the landscape and leading to an expansion of open grasslands, which were oftentimes subject to prolonged periods without rain. They argue that this progress may have begun as early as the beginning of the Pleistocene, with the team noting a marked decline in Quinkana material in the eastern Darling Downs following the end of the Pliocene. The extinction of Quinkana meant the disappearance of the last archosaur lineage with ziphodont dentition.
