= Paul Willis (science communicator) =

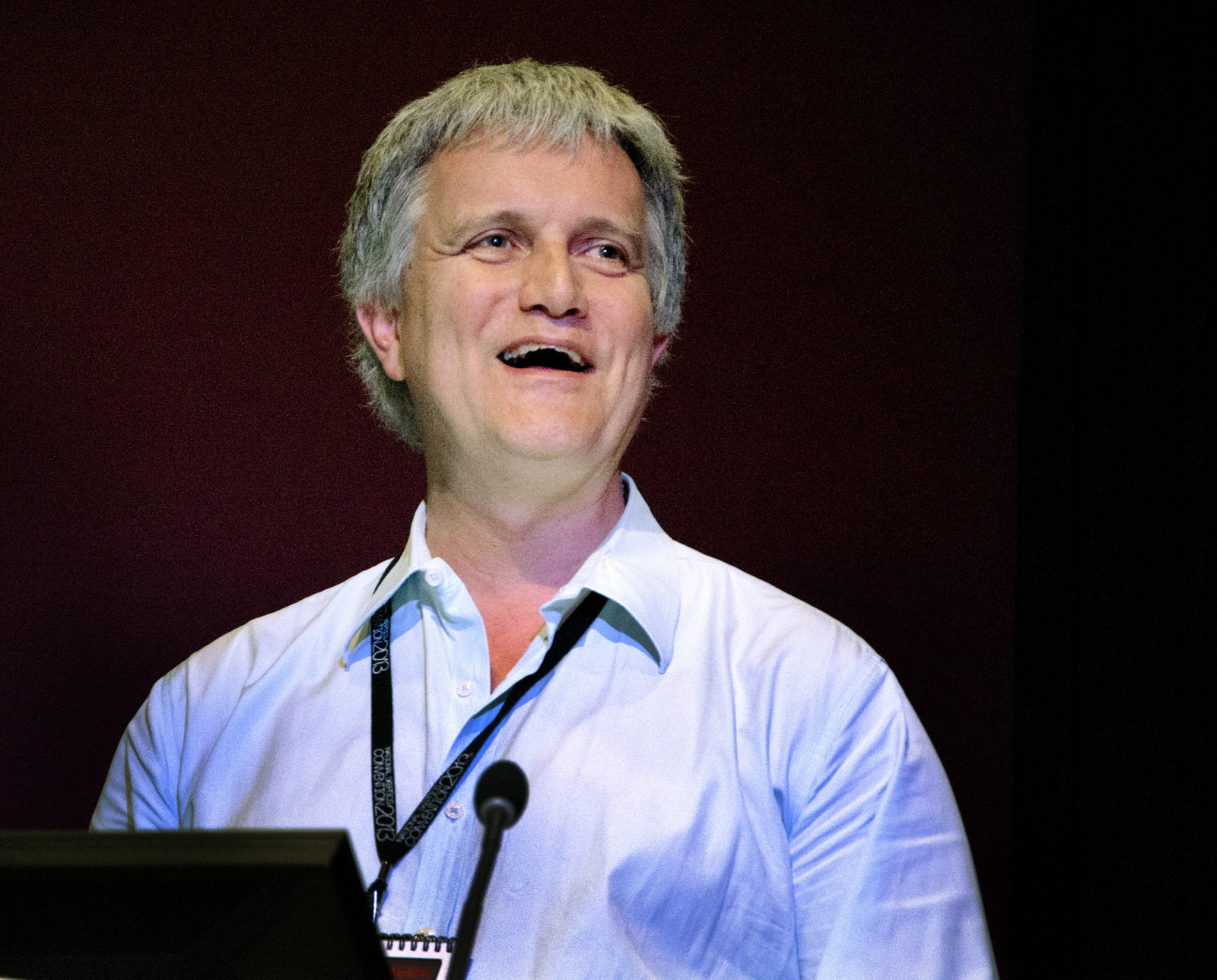
Willis speaking at the Australian Skeptics National Convention 2013

Paul M. A. Willis is an Australian palaeontologist, science communicator and former Director of the Royal Institution of Australia (RiAus).

== Career ==
Willis studied zoology and geology at University of Sydney and went on to complete a PhD in palaeontology at the University of New South Wales. He has been a resident palaeontologist on ten Antarctic expeditions and has written or co-authored eight books on dinosaurs, rocks and fossils.

While Willis found his first fossil when he was six, the earliest part of his collection was a small echinoid collected by his parents on their honeymoon. Willis completed a BSc at Sydney University in zoology and geology before conducting a PhD at the University of New South Wales. His Doctoral thesis was on The Phylogenetic Systematics of Australasian Crocodilians. Willis's doctoral studies resulted in the erection of several new taxa including the subfamily Mekosuchinae, and the genera Baru, Kambara, Australosuchus, Trilophosuchus and Harpacoshampsa. He conducted extensive field work, mostly in North Queensland, as well as completing a period as a paleontological preparator at the Australian Museum. During this time Willis prepared an opalised skeleton dubbed by him as Eric the Plesiosaur and later named Umoonasaurus.

In 1997, Willis commenced a traineeship with the ABC. During his career in public broadcasting, Willis went on to report and present stories for Quantum and Catalyst on ABC and the series Monster Bug Wars on SBS. Willis produced over 350 stories for Catalyst during a ten-year stint with the program. He left his employment at the ABC to take up directorship of the Royal Institution of Australia in 2011 which ended in July 2017. He also worked for ABC radio, creating The Correx Files for Triple J, presenting numerous regular science talkback segments on various radio stations across the country and contributing to The Science Show, Earthbeat and The Health Report..

Willis is now freelancing science communications through his company Media Engagement Services as well as conducting some paleontological studies as an Adjunct Associate Professor at Flinders University. He is also an ambassador for the National Secular Lobby.

== Honours ==
In 2000 Willis was a joint recipient of the Eureka Prize for Science Communication and was voted Australian Skeptic of the Year in 2002 for working to counter pseudoscience.
