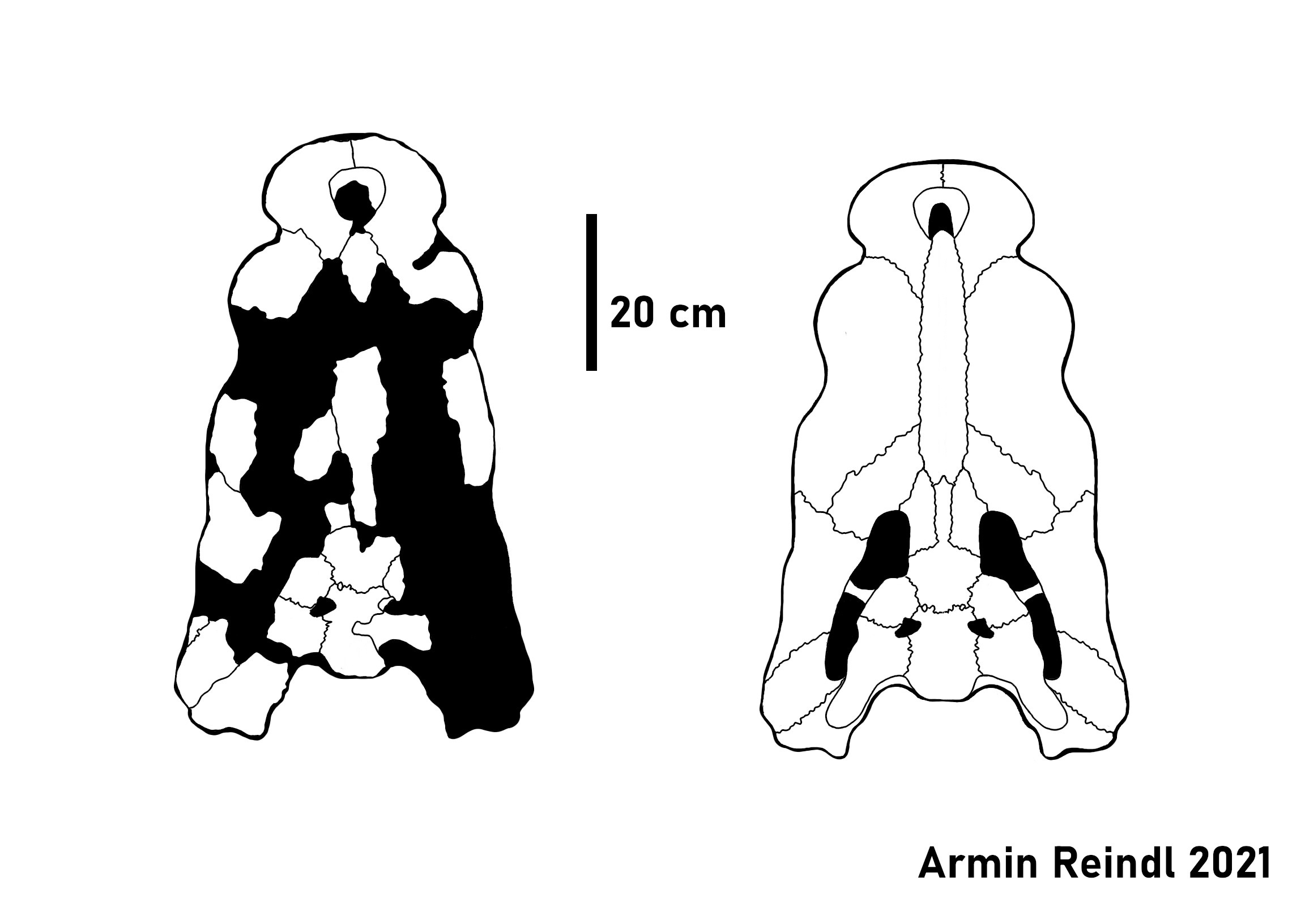
- Geoff Vincent's Specimen (holotype of P. vincenti)

Scientific classification
- Kingdom: Animalia
- Phylum: Chordata
- Class: Reptilia
- Order: Crocodylia
- Clade: †Mekosuchinae
- Genus: †Paludirex; Ristevski et al., 2020

Type species
- †Paludirex vincenti Ristevski et al., 2020

Other species
- †Paludirex gracilis (Willis & Molnar, 1997; formerly Pallimnarchus)

Synonyms
- Crocodylus pallimnarchus Sill, 1968 (in part); Pallimnarchus pollens De Vis, 1886 (in part)

= Paludirex =

Paludirex Temporal range: Pliocene-Pleistocene, 5.332–0.021 Ma

Extinct genus of reptiles

Paludirex (meaning "swamp king") is an extinct genus of mekosuchine crocodylian from the Pliocene and Pleistocene of Australia. A large and robust semi-aquatic ambush hunter capable of attaining lengths of up to 5 m (16 ft), it was likely the top predator of Australia's waterways prior to the appearance of modern saltwater crocodiles. Two species are known, the smaller Paludirex gracilis and the larger Paludirex vincenti. A third as of yet unnamed species may have also existed.

The history of Paludirex is long and complicated, largely due to its connection with the historic genus Pallimnarchus. While the name Pallimnarchus was coined in 1886, making it the first fossil crocodile named from Australia, this was done so merely out of convenience, and this initial description did not come with a proper diagnosis. Despite the lacking definition, subsequent authors referred more and more material to this genus, leading to several attempts at redefining it during the late 20th century. However, the loss of the lectotype material and a sudden surge in mekosuchine research meant that Pallimnarchus was insufficiently differentiated from other crocodilians, leading to the name being declared a nomen dubium in 2020. The better preserved material, including several skulls, were used to erect the new genus Paludirex. A side effect of this was that much of the material once assigned to Pallimnarchus is now of uncertain affinities, meaning that it is unknown whether or not it belongs to Paludirex or some other as of yet unrecognized crocodilian.

Though roughly the size of a modern saltwater crocodile, Paludirex vincenti was notably more robust, with much deeper and wider jaws. The jaws of Paludirex gracilis were shallower but nonetheless wide. This, combined with the upwards facing nostrils and eyes, indicates that Paludirex was a semi-aquatic ambush predator, likely preying on a wide range of prey animals from fish to mammalian megafauna. This would also set them apart ecologically from other contemporary crocodilians like the terrestrial Quinkana and the narrow-snouted freshwater crocodiles that appeared around the same time as P. gracilis.

Little is known about the extinction of Paludirex. It was among the last mekosuchines still found in Australia, surviving until at least 50,000 years ago, and likely disappeared alongside much of the continent's megafauna as part of the Late Quaternary extinction event. This disappearance is generally attributed to climate change, which would have led to widespread aridification and the destruction of the freshwater systems these crocodilians inhabited, though the extinction of the terrestrial Australian megafauna (which may have been human caused) may have been a contributing factor. Competition with saltwater crocodiles has also been proposed and is under investigation.

== Discovery and naming ==
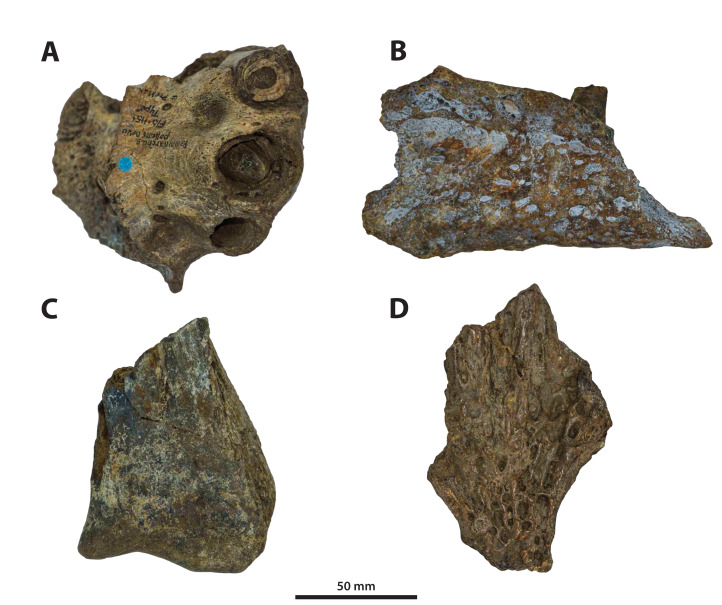
Syntype fossils of Pallimnarchus pollens. A is now considered a potential species of Paludirex, B has been identified as Quinkana and C & D are identified as Crocodylia incertae sedis.

=== Early history of Pallimnarchus ===
Although only named in 2020, Paludirex has a long and rich history thanks to its ties to the historic genus Pallimnarchus. Pallimnarchus pollens was informally described in 1886 by Charles Walter De Vis, who based the genus on skull remains and osteoderms discovered around 1860 that was mineralised by apatite. De Vis' collection lacked cohesion and not only consisted of material that belonged to different individuals, but even to different species, as one bone was later proven to have belonged to a species of Quinkana. Their exact origin is likewise not well recorded by De Vis, with the type locality of the remains being unknown beyond the fact that they stem from the Darling Downs region of Queensland. While this marked the first fossil crocodile ever described from Australia, De Vis, by his own admittance, was generally unfamiliar with the fossil record of Cenozoic crocodilians. Unable to guarantee that it could not be placed in any of the genera known at the time, De Vis coined the cabinet name Pallimnarchus "out of convenience". Despite the informal nature of this early research, and the fact that De Vis did not establish a holotype specimen, subsequent researchers generally accepted the name which came to see widespread use throughout the following 150 years.

During this timespan more and more crocodilian material came to be found across Australia, which was oftentimes simply assigned to Pallimnarchus based on superficial similarities. Among the more significant specimens referred to Pallimnarchus over the years was the so-called "Lansdowne Snout", which would go on to change classification multiple times before most recently being included within Paludirex. The name Pallimnarchus remained unchanged all the while, with the exception of one instance in 1968 when it was erroneously referred to as Crocodylus pallimnarchus by W. D. Sill. While the nomenclature used by Sill was incorrect, this would not be the only time a link between Pallimnarchus and the genus Crocodylus was made. In 1982 Australian paleontologist Ralph Molnar proposed that the "Lansdowne Snout" actually belonged to a saltwater crocodile, even going as far as to consider the idea that Pallimnarchus was actually a species of Crocodylus.

=== Revisions and second species ===
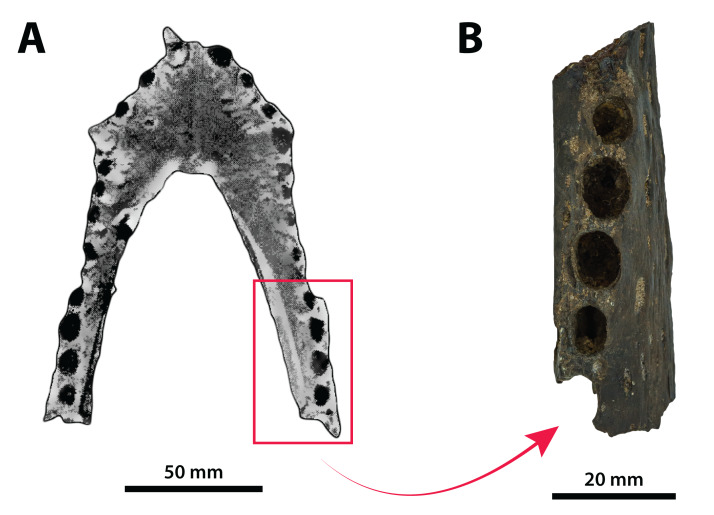
The lectotype of Pallimnarchus, B shows the only parts still known.

Molnar however did not follow through on that, instead publishing a formal redescription of Pallimnarchus later that same year. Molnar tentatively accepted the validity of Pallimnarchus as a genus but recognized the highly flawed nature of De Vis' work. Given the fact that De Vis' material consisted of fragmentary remains of multiple individuals, Molnar established a lectotype, the anterior portion of a lower jaw (specimen QMF1149) that was part of De Vis' original collection. Beyond being labeled as the holotype in collections already, this immature specimen was chosen as it was significantly more complete than the other material the genus had previously been based on. However, Molnar's description was still limited in comparison, with only four other Australasian crocodilians being known at the time: the saltwater crocodile, freshwater crocodile, New Guinea crocodile and Quinkana.

Not long after this first attempt at revising Pallimnarchus, even more material came out of Queensland, most notably the "Mirani Shire skull" and the "Dalby specimen", also known as "Geoff Vincent's specimen". The former was discovered prior to 1986 by Jack Williams Jr. in what may have been the Pioneer Valley near Mackay and represents a partial skull of which the entire dorsal surface is encased by concrete. The latter on the other hand was discovered sometime between 1984 and 1990 by Geoff Vincent near the Chinchilla Rifle Range in the western Darling Downs region and consists of a series of associated skull fragments that were eventually loaned to the Queensland Museum.

The 90s saw a marked increase regarding the known extinct crocodilian fauna of Australia, with a multitude of taxa being named from 1990 onward. Although at first only referred to as the "Australian tertiary radiation", the group eventually became known as the Mekosuchinae, with Pallimnarchus serving as one of its earliest recognized members. A second attempt at refining Pallimnarchus was published some years later in 1997, with Molnar this time working alongside crocodilian expert Paul Willis. Willis and Molnar worked on multiple specimens that were referred to Pallimnarchus at the time, which resulted in them recognizing a second species that they dubbed Pallimnarchus gracilis. Beyond the type material, which consisted of a premaxilla found in association with a dentary fragment, they also assigned both the "Lansdowne snout" and the "Mirani Shire skull" to this new species while placing "Geoff Vincent's specimen" in Pallimnarchus pollens.

=== Paludirex ===
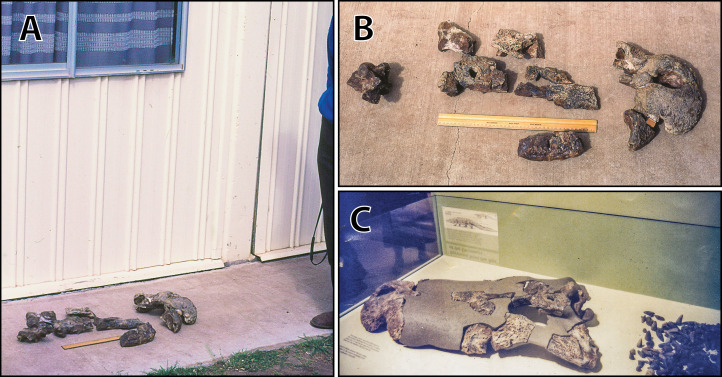
Various images of Geoff Vincent's specimen.

Things once again fell silent around Pallimnarchus during the 2000s, with publications on this genus only appearing occasionally. This was not helped by the fact that Molnar's lectotype was lost following his initial redescription, with Jorgo Ristevski and colleagues suspecting that the material disappeared sometime during the late 90s or early 2000s. The fate and current whereabouts of the lectotype are unknown and even a thorough search of the collection of the Queensland Museum in 2004 only yielded a singular, non-diagnostic fragment of said specimen with the remainder of the mandible nowhere to be found. This means that the only source for information on the lectotype are the illustrations and photographs provided by Molnar in the 1982 paper. In 2008, "Geoff Vincent's specimen" was returned to Dot Vincent, the wife of the late Geoff Vincent, who subsequently donated it to the Chinchilla Museum. In the process one skull fragment was accidentally left behind in Brisbane, which led to different parts of the skull now having different specimen numbers.

By then it had become clear that Pallimnarchus had once again entered taxonomic limbo in spite of the previous efforts by Willis and Molnar, as the attempts at redefining the genus were insufficient to differentiate it from the surge of new mekosuchines and the lectotype itself disappeared. Ristevski et al. published a third and final revision of the genus in 2020, declaring it dubious based on the fact that no distinguishing features could be found in the small piece of the lectotype that still remained. The team, which included Ralph Molnar, instead established a new name for the material previously assigned to Pallimnarchus. The result of their work was Paludirex vincenti, a taxon not based on mandibular remains as Pallimnarchus was but based on the skull fragments that compose "Geoff Vincent's specimen".

While this decision finally established a well preserved holotype and provided a detailed diagnosis, it also meant that the vast quantity of material previously assigned to Pallimnarchus had to be reevaluated, with mixed results. Some specimens, notably those that preserve elements of the cranium, could confidently be assigned to the newly erected genus. A premaxilla and maxilla found near the Condamine River near Warra were attributued to Paludirex vincenti and the "Mirani Shire skull" could at least be tentatively assigned to the species. Additionally, the "Lansdowne Snout" was referred to P. vincenti three years later. Furthermore, the validity of the material previously dubbed Pallimnarchus gracilis was confirmed, creating the new combination Paludirex gracilis. However, Paludirex gracilis was now restricted to the type material, the premaxilla and the associated dentary fragment.

The switch to "Geoff Vincent's specimen" as the holotype did have one big drawback, which is that the specimen has no associated mandibular remains. This means that the only lower jaw remains currently referable to Paludirex are those directly associated with the premaxilla of P. gracilis, meaning that the validity of many of the mandibles previously referred to Palimnarchus is up in the air. Although it is deemed likely that some, although not all, of these lower jaws did belong to Paludirex, they cannot be confidently assigned to the new genus until fossils are found that preserve both the upper and lower jaws in association with one another. Until such a fossil is found, these remains can only be identified as Crocodilia indet. and nothing more specific. Ristevski and his team further highlight various possible scenarios for the future of Pallimnarchus. Should the lectotype be rediscovered, there is the possibility that Paludirex may eventually become a junior synonym of Pallimnarchus. At the same time, it is just as likely that future research finds the two to be different animals altogether, as the presence of multiple broad-snouted crocodilians in the Pliocene of Australia is not only possible but very likely. However, both of these possible scenarios hinge on the lectotype being rediscovered, it preserving previously unrecognized diagnostic features and finally for there to be sufficient overlapping material of other crocodilians to compare it to. Until then, Pallimnarchus is treated as a nomen dubium and Paludirex as valid and distinct taxon.

=== Etymology ===
Paludirex is derived from the Latin words "paludis" and "rex", translating to "swamp king". This etymology was deliberately chosen to maintain a connection with its predecessor, as it serves as a rough equivalent to the etymology of Pallimnarchus, whose name translated to "ruler of all swamps".

== Species ==
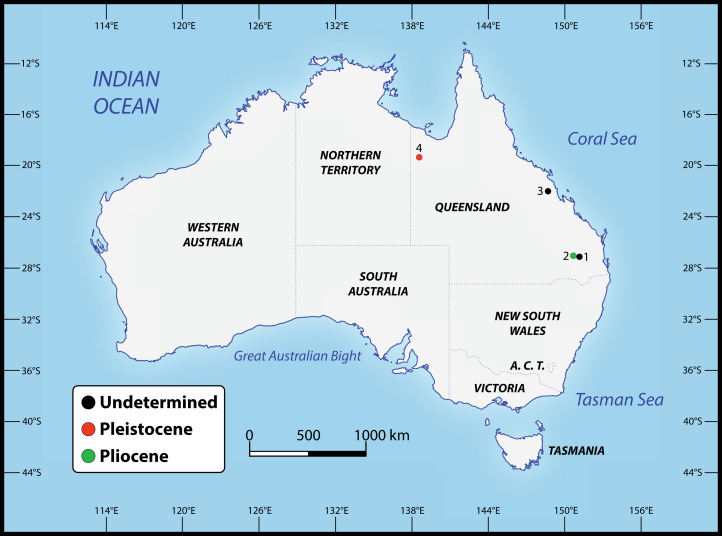
Known distribution of Paludirex specimens. 1 to 3 all show localities yielding Paludirex vincenti, whereas 4 is the only known occurrence of Paludirex gracilis.

- Paludirex gracilis

P. gracilis is the smaller of the two species and its fossils are exclusively known from the Late Pleistocene deposits of the Terrace Site within the Riversleigh World Heritage Area, making it one of the last remaining mekosuchines in Australia. Originally described as Pallimnarchus gracilis, this species managed to maintain its validity even after the 2020 revision of Pallimnarchus. The name is derived from the fact that the fossil material was notably more gracile than that of Pallimnarchus pollens and Paludirex vincenti.

- Paludirex vincenti

The larger and more robust of the two species, P. vincenti is also the older of the two, although the age records are muddy. The type specimen is confirmed to have been collected from Pliocene strata, but the Condamine material was found in a region that preserves both Pliocene and Pleistocene fossils. The Lansdowne snout comes from deposits inferred to be of Pleistocene age and while the origins of the "Mirani Shire skull" are not fully understood, it may have also come from the Pleistocene deposits near South Walker Creek. Assuming that the "Mirani Shire skull" did indeed belong to P. vincenti, the species would have ranged from Darling Downs in the south to the Nebo district in the north and existed from the Pliocene to Pleistocene. Paludirex vincenti derives its name from Geoff Vincent, who discovered the holotype skull.

Although few remains have been assigned to each species respectively, there are several specimens previously referred to Pallimnarchus that may represent additional species distinct from either Paludirex gracilis or Paludirex vincenti. Examples of this include QMF1152, one of De Vis' Pallimnarchus fossils, QMF1154, a snout fragment from the same deposits as Paludirex vincenti and NHMUK PV OR 43047a, from the Clifton area on the Darling Downs. These fossils share some aspects with the two recognized Paludirex species while differing in others, and based on this they may represent an additional third species of Paludirex that lived during the Pliocene to Pleistocene in Queensland. However, until further research is conducted and a name is coined, this animal is only referred to as the Darling Downs taxon by Risevski and colleagues. Fossil material from Bandiln͟gan in Western Australia may also be referrable to Paludirex and have been assigned to Pallimnarchus in the past, though their age is poorly understood.

== Description ==
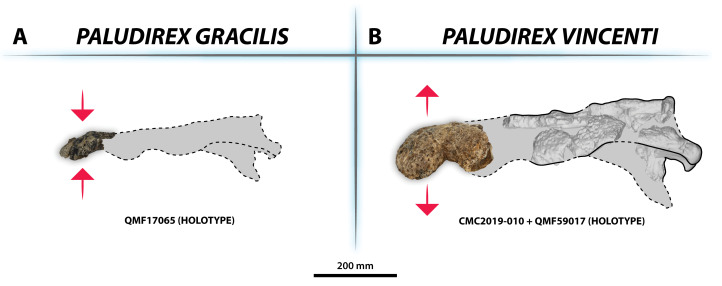
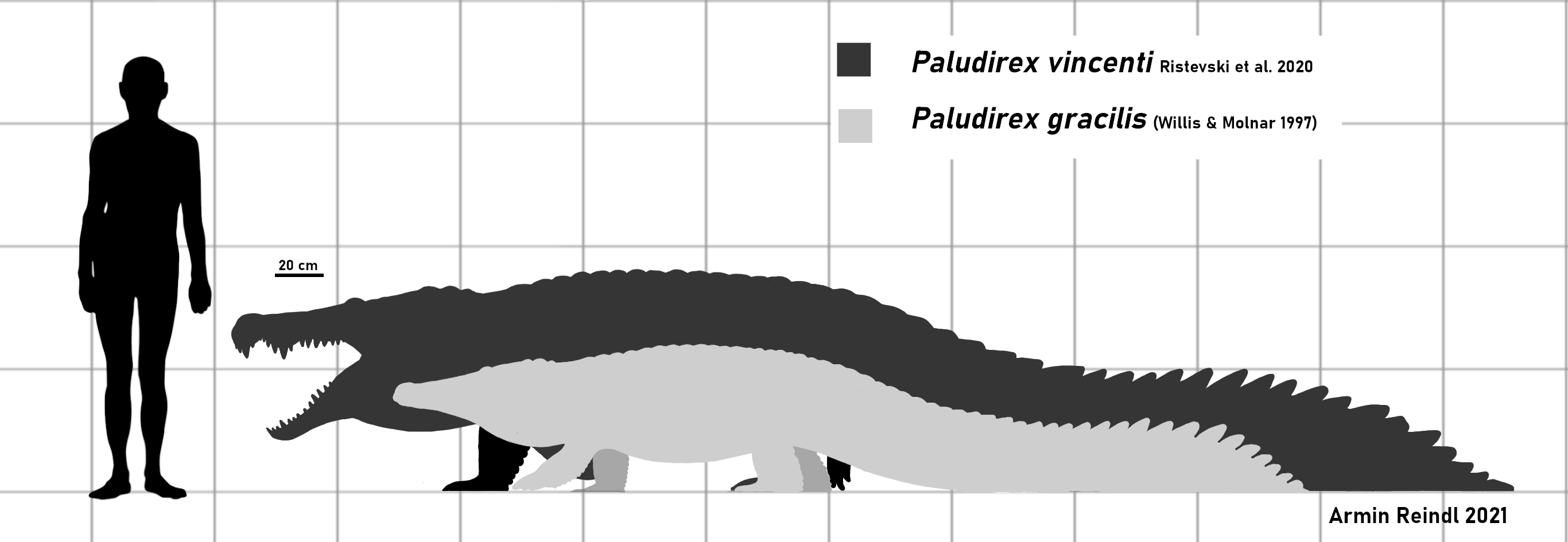
Paludirex gracilis was overall smaller and less robust than Paludirex vincenti.

Paludirex was a large-bodied mekosuchine that bears all the hallmarks of a semi-aquatic ambush predator, possessing a platyrostral (flattened) skull as well as nostrils that were directed upwards like in many modern crocodilians. On the surface, Paludirex is best distinguished from other mekosuchines not just in size but also in the proportions of its skull. In Paludirex vincenti the skull was robust and deep like in Baru, but not to the same degree as in altirostral forms like Quinkana. This applies even moreso to Paludirex gracilis, which had a much shallower snout compared to its older relative. More importantly, the skull of both species of Paludirex was proportionally very wide. This is especially prominent in Paludirex vincenti, which had a rostrum that is around half as wide as the entire skull is long.

Another feature that easily distinguishes Paludirex from Baru is the shape of the premaxilla, which slopes gently and does not end in a nearly vertical line, as is the case for species of Baru. The external nares of Paludirex are approximately circular in shape and almost entirely encased by the premaxilla, with only a small section at the posterior margin being composed of the nasal. How far the nasal would have extended into the nares is unclear as the anterior-most tip is broken off. In keeping with the skull's overall brevirostrine (blunt snouted) and platyrostral morphology, the premaxillae are wider than they are long. The transition from premaxilla to maxilla is marked by deep notches on each side which accommodate the large dentary teeth when the jaws are closed, constricting the skull in top view. One feature defining Paludirex vincenti, though unknown in Paludirex gracilis, is that the anterior part of the jugal has a heavily sculpted side and that the ascending process, which forms the lower part of the postorbital bar, is deeply inset from the rest of the bone. Although not visible when looking at the surface of the skull, the inner side of the jugal just below the postorbital bar is concave. The nasal bones appear to have fused in the holotype, which may be tied to the size and age of "Geoff Vincent's specimen". Something similar is observed in modern saltwater crocodiles, in which older specimens have fused nasals. Where the narrow anterior process of the frontal meets the nasal, the suture between the bones is approximately trident-shaped, each "prong" being on roughly the same level. However, this suture is only visible when looking at the skull from below and cannot be determined in top view. The space between the eyesockets is relatively wide and the orbital margins are rugose in their texture. The frontal preserves no sagittal crest.

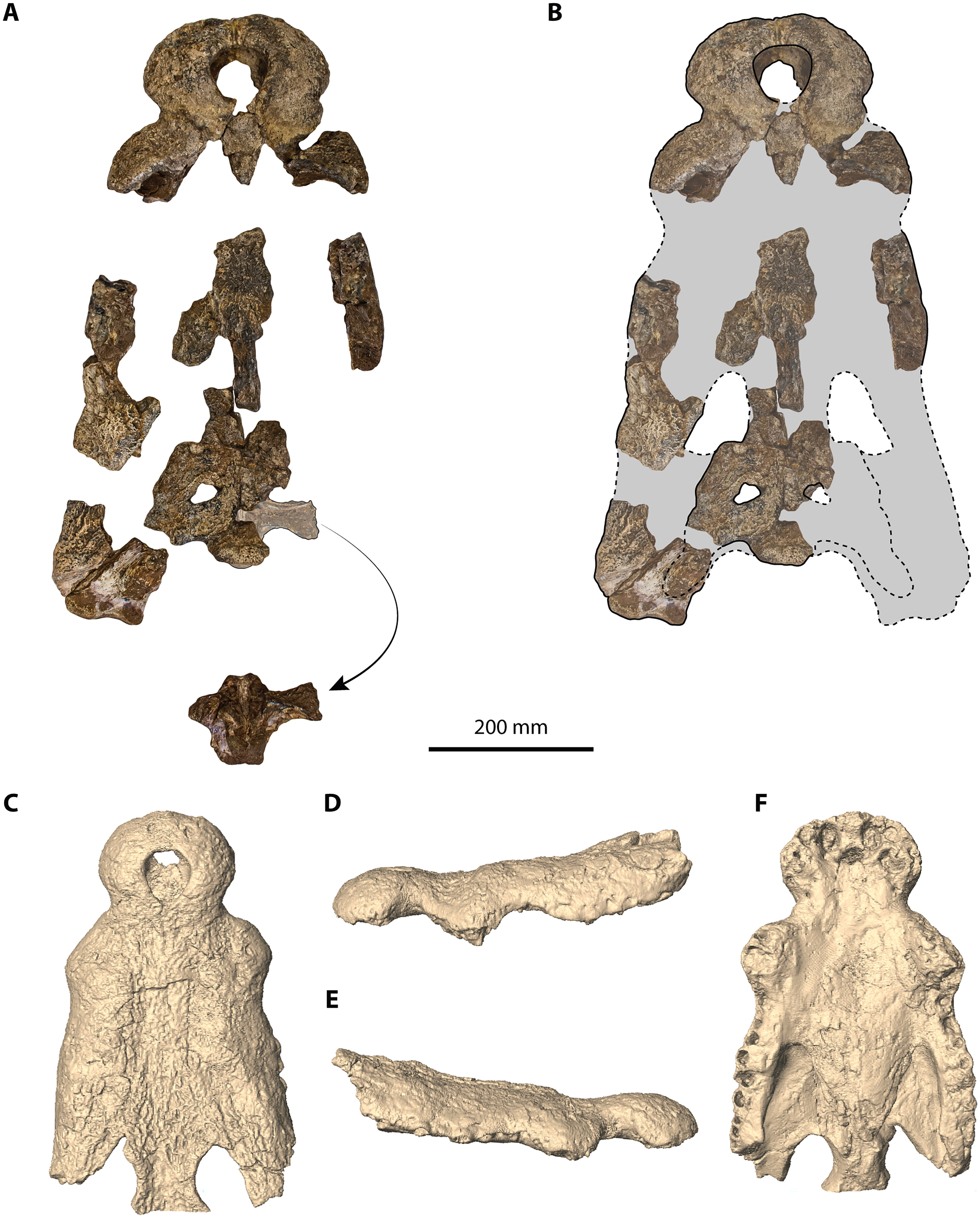
Geoff Vincent's specimen (A,B) and the Lansdowne Snout (C-F).

The frontal bone also contributues significantly to the skull table, forming most of the anterior region as in other crocodilians. The contact between the frontal and the parietal bone is relatively straight except for a small process where the frontal extends into the parietal. Notably, the ventral process of the parietal, the part of the bone that descends into the inner parts of the skull, is oriented almost vertically and thus not visible when viewing the skull from atop. It is however important as it bears some distinctive foramina. Just before the supratemporal fenestra, along the contact between frontal and parietals, there are two prominent pits that are noticeably deeper than the pitted ornamentation that covers the remainder of the skull table. These pits appear similar to those seen in the much older Kambara, one of the earliest mekosuchines. The fenestrae themselves are D-shaped and proportionally small, occupying less than 10% of the surface of the skull table. Given their reduced size, the interfenestral bar, composed of both parietal and squamosal, is accordingly wide. The central portion of the skull table is somewhat low, ascending again towards the back into a rounded swelling that forms the back of the element and extends beyond the medial section of the squamosal bone that contacts the parietal. The nature of the supraoccipital in relation to the skull table is somewhat unclear. Typically, prominent exposure of this bone is considered a potentially defining trait of mekosuchines, however it is not clear if the same applies to Paludirex. Though a sub-trapezoid element of the skull table is known that would match the supraoccipital, it is unclear how much of it, if any is actually composed of this bone. Thus it's either possible that the supraoccipital contributed heavily to the dorsal surface of the skull table, or that this section was mainly composed of the parietal instead.

If one follows the interpretation that the supraoccipital is not exposed dorsally, then the parietal would be quite heavily involved in forming the occipital face, the back of the head. The occipital lamina, an element of the supraoccipital, is directed back and down and the postoccipital process of that same bone is very short. Another aspect of the supraoccipital highlighted in the diagnosis of Paludirex vincenti is that the occipital lamina bears a nuchal crest, which is not bordered by concavities. The sides of the supraoccipital adjacent to the crest are flat and featureless, lacking the concavities seen in saltwater crocodiles or Kambara.

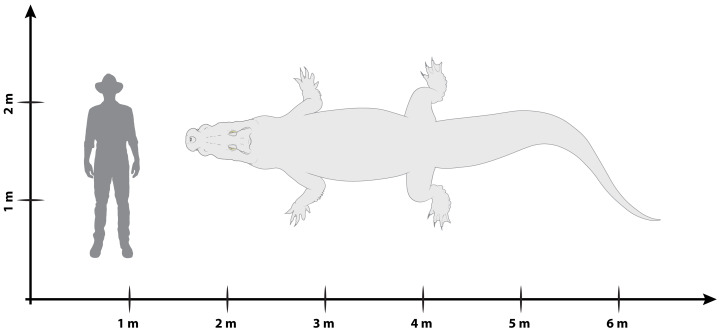
Approximate size of Paludirex vincenti.

=== Dentition ===
In Paludirex, the first two teeth within the premaxilla sit atop an alveolar process, a ridge, that arches towards the roof of the mouth. Furthermore, both of these teeth are roughly in line with another, meaning they are positioned in such a way that neither is located further to the front or back than the other. This can be observed clearly in both Paludirex gracilis and Paludirex vincenti. However, it is noted in both the type description of Paludirex and the later 2023 review of Australasian crocodilians that this does not seem to be the case in the other Darling Downs crocodilian, which may represent a third species of Paludirex. At the same time, Ristevski and colleagues note that the space between these first teeth is notably enlarged in the named forms, much larger than the distance between any of the other premaxillary teeth, yet in the Darling Downs form they are closely spaced. All tooth sockets within the premaxilla are sub-circular to circular in appearance and the same is true for the maxillary teeth of Paludirex vincenti, though the same cannot be confirmed for Paludirex gracilis. Regardless, this clearly sets it apart from the ziphodont teeth of Quinkana, which were flattened side to side (labiolingually). The first teeth of the maxilla are all very closely spaced, with little to no space between them.

Although no complete mandibles are known yet, the fossils of the upper jaws indicate that Paludirex had an overbite akin to an alligator, with the exception of the enlarged fourth tooth that would have slid neatly into the notch between the premaxilla and maxilla. This is based on the fact that there are no reception pits left by the dentary teeth between the teeth of the upper jaw.

Like in most other mekosuchines, the teeth varied greatly in size. Among the maxillary teeth, the largest tooth sockets were around twice as large as the smallest. Each premaxilla preserves five teeth, with 14 more teeth on each maxilla based on the "Mirani Shire Skull". The fourth tooth within the premaxilla is the largest, as typical in crocodilians, more specifically in Paludirex it's one and a half (in P. gracilis) to two times (in P. vincenti) as large as the preceding third tooth. Among the teeth of the maxilla, the fifth is the largest, which once again matches the pattern seen in most other crocodilians. Still, it serves to distinguish named Paludirex species from Quinkana and the Darling Downs form, in both of which the fourth and fifth premaxillary teeth are almost equal in size. The teeth themselves were conical and showed no grooves in the tooth enamel like in Crocodylus species, while the cutting edges (carinae) had minor crenulations that were likely not true denticles. This yet again differentiates Paludirex from the contemporary Quinkana and its ziphodont dentition.

=== Size ===
Paludirex vincenti had one of the largest skulls among mekosuchines, with that of the type specimen measuring around 65 cm (26 in) long. In turn this indicates that Paludirex was a strong and large animal, with length estimates indicating that it attained lengths of up to 5 m (16 ft), putting it in a similar range as modern saltwater crocodiles. Paludirex gracilis was smaller, but still obtained a sizable 4 m (13 ft) in length, putting it on par with species of Baru.

== Phylogeny ==
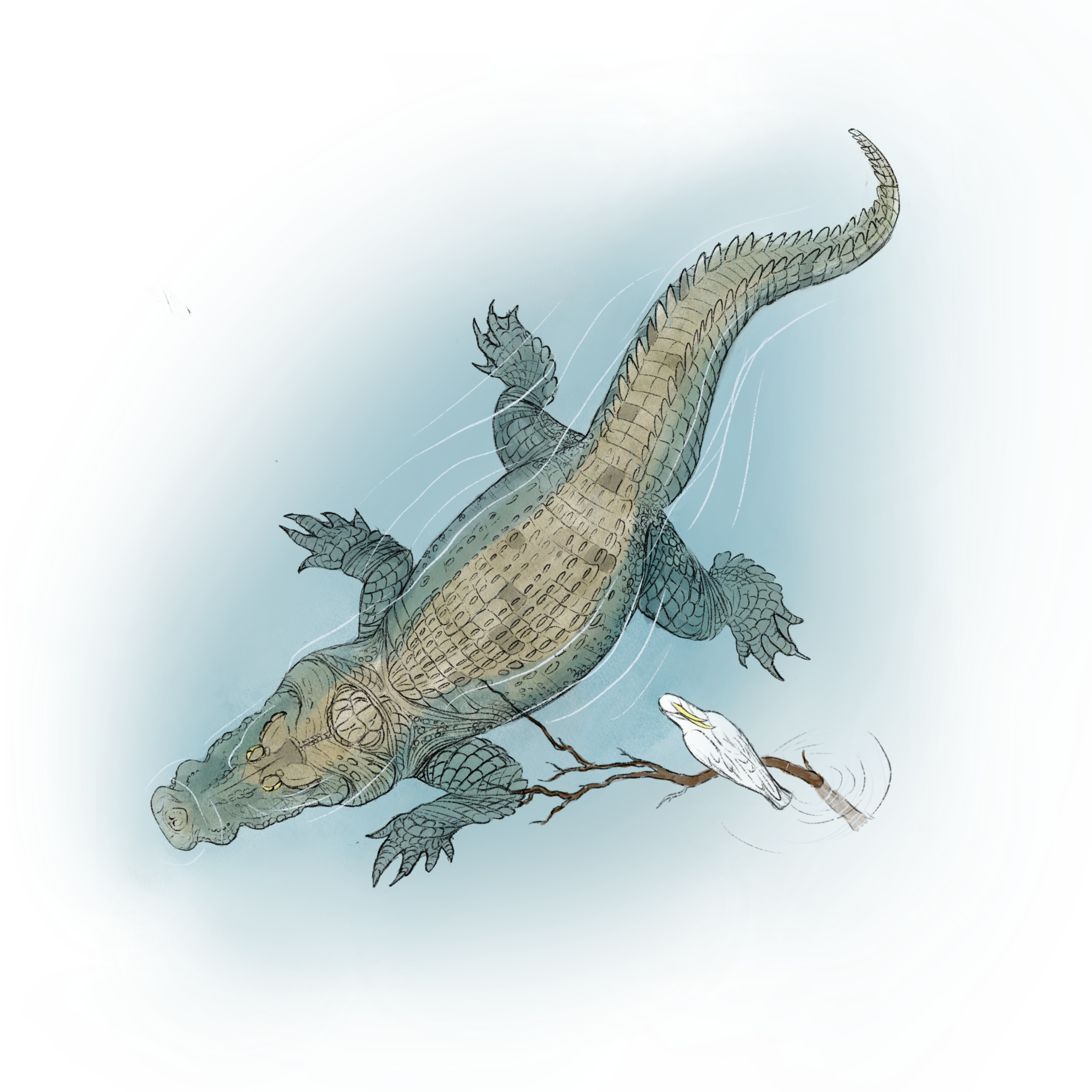
Life restoration

Although Pallimnarchus, as the earliest discovered fossil crocodilian of Australia, was crucial in establishing the presence of the "Australian tertiary radiation" (later known as Mekosuchinae), its precise position within this group remained unclear for a long time. Given the poor description of the remains assigned to Pallimnarchus and the rapid increase in research on this group, its placement shifted multiple times throughout the 90s and 2000s. In this time period, Pallimnarchus commonly claded with other generalist platyrostral members of the group, such as Australosuchus in Willis (1997), alongside Australosuchus and Kambara in Mead et al. (2002) and with Kalthifrons and Baru in Lee and Yates (2018).

- - Mekosuchinae
    - Australosuchus†
    - - - Kambara taraina†
        - Kambara implexidens†
      - - Kambara murgonensis†
        - - - - Kalthifrons†
              - Pallimnarchus†
            - - Baru wickeni†
              - - Baru darrowi†
                - Baru Alcoota†
          - - - Bullock Creek taxon†
              - "Baru" huberi†
            - - Volia†
              - - Mekosuchus†
                - - Trilophosuchus†
                  - Quinkana†
  - Longirostres

The erection of Paludirex by Ristevski et al., establishing a proper diagnosis for the genus, paved the way for thorough and more reliable phylogenetic results. The phylogenetic analysis conducted as part of this paper yielded two results. The first, which was run without implied weighting, only yielded a poorly resolved paraphyletic Mekosuchinae, leading to the team conducting a second analysis with clearer results. Under implied weighting Paludirex was found at the base of a clade that contained both Quinkana and Kalthifrons as well as Mekosuchus and Baru. A few years later a more thorough analysis was conducted, published in 2023. This analysis largely resembles the results achieved by Lee and Yates five years prior. More specifically, Paludirex was recovered as a close relative of Baru like Pallimnarchus was in the work of Lee and Yates. The core difference being that in 2018, Pallimnarchus was found as a close relative of Kalthifrons, whereas Ristevski et al. found Paludirex to be situated just outside the clade formed by Baru and Quinkana.

- - Mekosuchinae
    - - Kambara implexidens
      - - Kambara taraina
        - Kambara murgonensis
    - - Australosuchus clarkae
      - - Paludirex vincenti
        - - - Quinkana timara
            - Kalthifrons aurivellensis
          - - - Mekosuchus whitehunterensis
              - Mekosuchus sanderi
            - - Baru wickeni
              - Baru darrowi

- - Crocodyloidea
    - "Crocodylus" megarhinus†
    - - Mekosuchinae
        - Kalthifrons aurivellensis†
        - - Kambara spp.†
          - - Australosuchus clarkae†
            - - - "Baru" huberi†
                - - Trilophosuchus rackhami†
                  - - Volia athollandersoni†
                    - - Mekosuchus whitehunterensis†
                      - - Mekosuchus sanderi†
                        - Mekosuchus inexpectatus†
              - - - Paludirex vincenti†
                  - Paludirex gracilis†
                - - Baru spp.†
                  - Quinkana spp.†
      - Crocodylidae

== Paleobiology ==
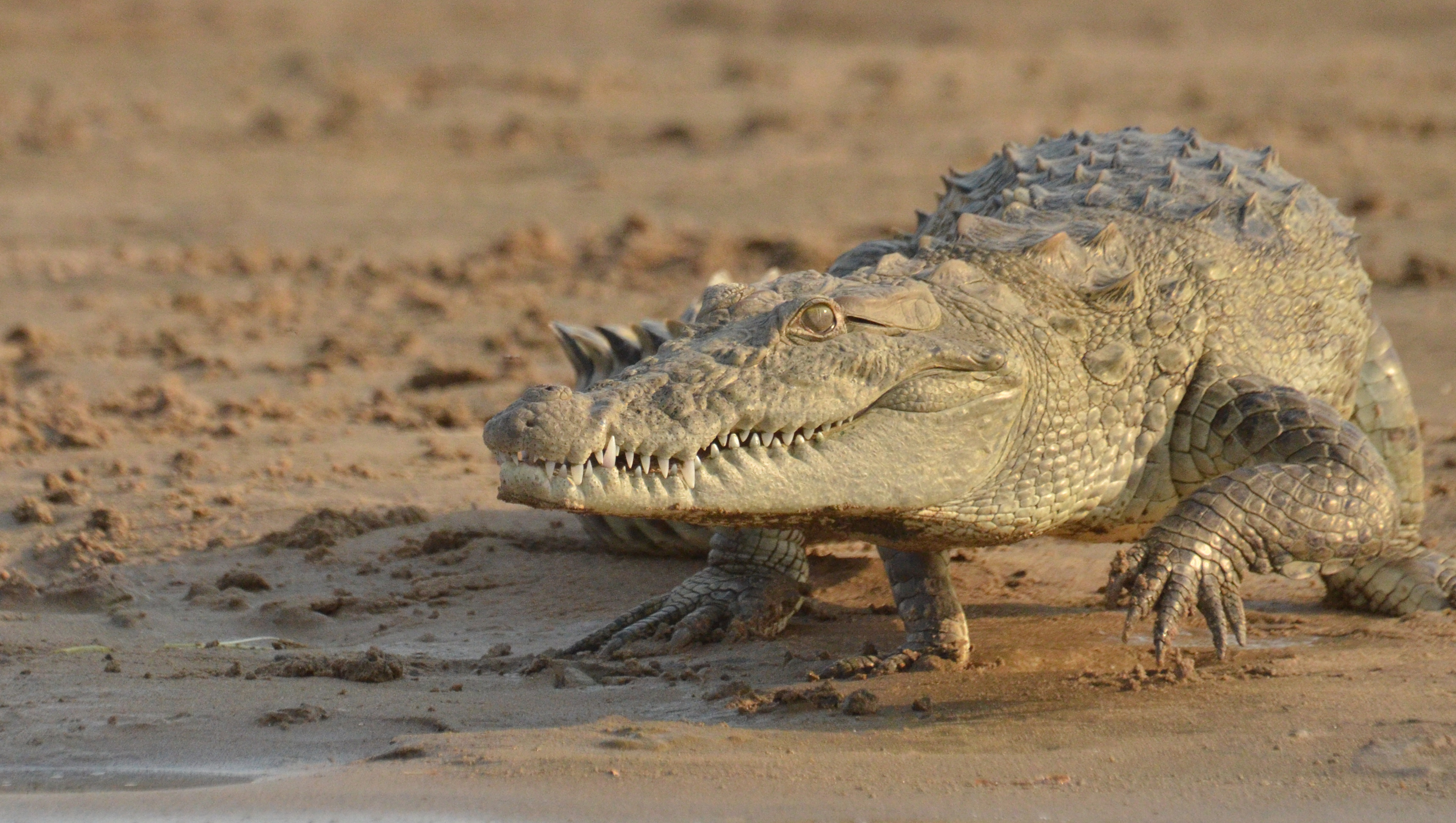
Paludirex may have been ecologically similar to today's mugger crocodile.

=== Paleoecology ===
Given the uncertain state of much of the material previously assigned to Pallimnarchus, little is known for certain about the ecology and paleobiology of Paludirex. Based on the anatomy of its skull, Paludirex would have most likely been a semi-aquatic ambush predator, a lifestyle consistent with that previously suggested for Palimnarchus and seen in modern crocodilians. From these similarities it has been further interpreted that Paludirex was a generalist, capable of preying on a wide range of prey items. Willis and Molnar go into more detail, comparing the anatomy of the "Mirani Shire skull" and the "Lansdowne snout", both now recognized as Paludirex vincenti, to the modern mugger crocodile and the extinct Purussaurus neivensis back in 1997. Though little information was inferred from Purussaurus, they conclude from the similarities to mugger crocodiles that Paludirex may have preyed on a variety of animals, including but not limited to fish, birds, turtles and moderately sized mammals. Given the impressive size of Paludirex vincenti, it would have been capable of preying on many of the large marsupials native to Darling Downs.

Willis and Molnar further use mugger crocodiles to make guesses on the habitat of Paludirex. Like the extant species, Paludirex may have inhabited a wide variety of environments ranging from lakes and swamps to rivers and marshes, although some researchers suggest that these animals may have avoided coastal waters.

=== Intraspecific combat ===
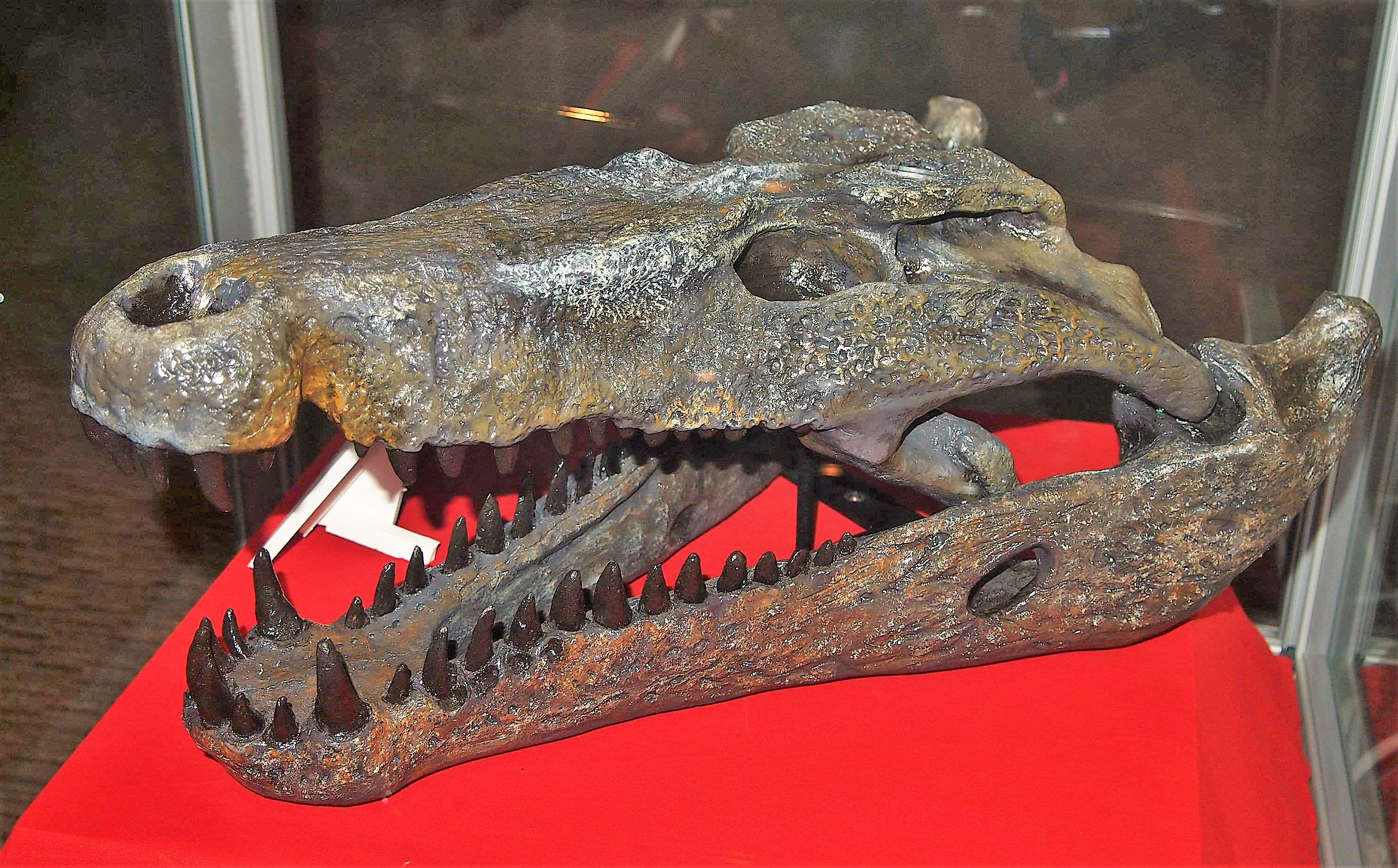
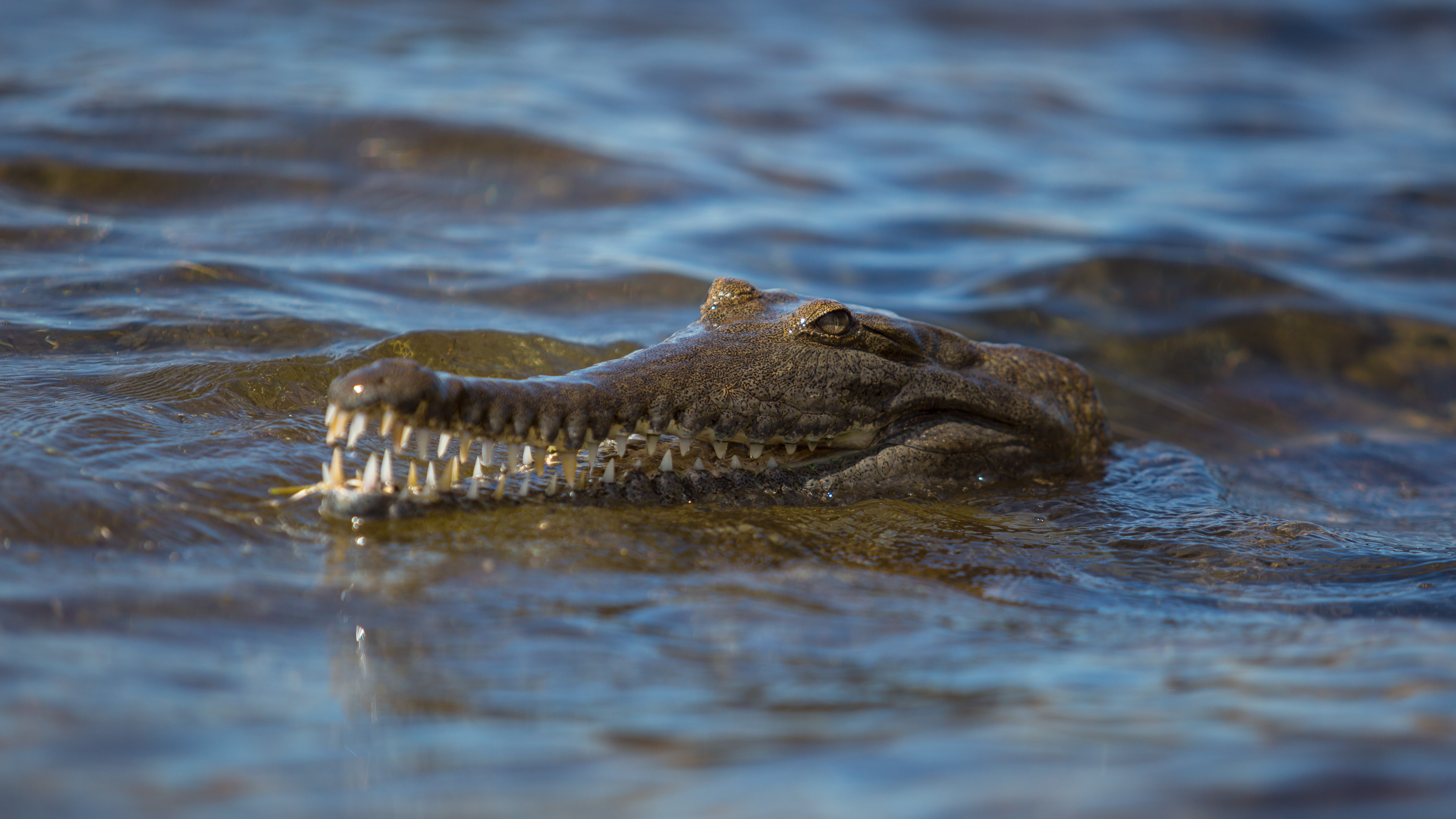
The range of Paludirex overlaps with other crocodilians like Quinkana and the freshwater crocodile.

There may be some evidence for interspecific or intraspecific conflict between Pliocene crocodilians, though it is not certain if the fossil evidence actually represents Paludirex. One fossil of an injured metatarsal was found at the Pliocene Bluff Downs fossil site, which yielded remains assigned to Crocodylus, Quinkana and Pallimnarchus. Proportional differences do show that the bone couldn't have belonged to a saltwater crocodile, although later work emphasized that the Bluff Downs Crocodylus likely represents an as of yet unnamed species anyways, and Quinkana is disregarded by Mackness and Sutton due to its inferred terrestrial habits and its size. Subsequently, the metatarsal was assigned to Pallimnarchus. Given that no postcranial material was every directly associated with Pallimnarchus and the 2020 revisions, it is currently unclear whether or not the metatarsal could have belonged to Paludirex. Regardless, the bone would match a large semi-aquatic crocodilian. The fossil shows signs of osteoperiostitis following what was likely the bite of another crocodilian, either a member of the same species or of a different one. The bone is thought to have belonged to a large male based on its size, which would match well with the fights that occur between members of this sex during the mating season in modern crocodiles. The area of the attack would also match this interpretation, with intraspecific combat in crocodilians often being aimed at the tail and occurring from below, which in this case may have led to the loss of a toe. A similar paper was published by Mackness and colleagues ten years later, this time reporting on a pathological femur from the Pliocene Chinchilla Sands. Much like with Mackness' previous work, there is no direct evidence that this fossil actually belonged to Pallimnarchus or Paludirex. Akin to their previous study, the referral was based on clear differences with Crocodylus and a size that was deemed too large to have come from Quinkana, leaving Pallimnarchus. The femur shows signs of trauma followed by osteitis and infection, which, like the pathology of the Bluff Downs bone, was most likely the result of an attack by another crocodile.

=== Sympatric crocodilians ===
While mekosuchines were already on the decline in Australia by the Pliocene, Paludirex nonetheless coexisted with other crocodilians. The most famous of its contemporaries was Quinkana, an animal with serrated teeth often thought to have been terrestrial in nature. Given the likely terrestrial habits of Quinkana and the semi-aquatic habits of Paludirex, the two animals likely did not compete for the same resources, explaining how they coexisted. Another species that possibly coexisted with Paludirex vincenti was Gunggamarandu, a large-bodied relative of today's false gharial. However, as with the Darling Downs Paludirex fossils, it is unclear where exactly the remains of Gunggamarandu came from. This leaves it ambiguous whether or not the two actually shared the same environment.

While Paludirex and Quinkana are thought to have led different lifestyles, the former may have still had to share its habitat. Fossil evidence from Darling Downs suggest that there was at least one other semi-aquatic crocodilian native to the region, possibly an as of yet unnamed species of Paludirex. This is based on the discovery of remains from the same Pliocene localities as P. vincenti that differed from the anatomy of either named species, having slightly different proportions and tooth arrangements. This form, at times referred to as the Darling Downs taxon, shared the robust skull of P. vincenti, but seemingly grew no larger than P. gracilis.

Later, during the Pleistocene, Paludirex occurred alongside more modern members of Australia's crocodilian fauna. Specifically, the only known fossil remains of the freshwater crocodile have been collected from the same strata as the type material of Paludirex gracilis. They may have also coexisted near what is now the Leichhardt River, but as of the 2020 paper it is uncertain if the remains from there are actually referable to Paludirex gracilis. Regardless, while these two animals differed less drastically in their preferred habitat, their coexistence was made possible by the fact that they nonetheless filled different niches. While P. gracilis was more gracile in respects to P. vincenti, it still displayed a broad snout suited for a more generalist lifestyle, whereas the slender jaws of freshwater crocodiles are better adapted to catching small prey such as fish.

Whether Paludirex also coexisted with saltwater crocodiles is less clear. Although there is ample material that has been historically assigned to saltwater crocodiles, recent research casts doubt over the correctness of these interpretations. Ristevski and colleagues argue that saltwater crocodiles only arrived in Australia comparatively recently, showing no confirmed overlap in their distribution with the last individuals of Paludirex. However, there are as of yet unidentified Crocodylus remains dating as far back as the Pliocene, which may have belonged to an animal that could have encountered Paludirex.

=== Extinction ===
Paludirex was among the last mekosuchines still found on the Australian continent, only survived by the species that spread to the islands of the South Pacific. Among the youngest are the fossil remains of Paludirex gracilis from the Terrace Site in the vicinity of Riversleigh in northwest Queensland, possibly dating to around 28,000 to 21,000 years ago, though the estimate has been regarded as unreliable, meaning the material may in fact be older, perhaps up to 50,000 years old. A tooth (QMF59869) from South Walker Creek which dates to at minimum, 20,000 years ago, belongs to a blunt toothed mekosuchine, possibly Paludirex, which is the youngest known mekosuchine fossil in Australia. The disappearance of Paludirex coincides with the extinction of the Australian megafauna and is generally attributed to habitat loss caused by climate change. Widespread aridification greatly affected the various freshwater basins that this crocodilian was native to while also affecting other freshwater megafauna. Hocknull et al. suggest that species of Crocodylus may have avoided the brunt of these events by retreating into more coastal waters, whereas the native mekosuchines may have been more dependent on freshwater. Loss of terrestrial megafauna prey may also have been a factor in the extinction of Paludirex. Though human involvement has been proposed to have been a factor by some authors, others dispute this, instead claiming the extinction of much of the megafauna inhabiting modern Australia (then the continent of Sahul) happened before human arrival, though this claim has been disputed, with other studies finding that many Australian megafauna species are known to have inhabited the continent at the time of human arrival. It has also been suggested that competition with saltwater crocodiles may have factored into its extinction. Saltwater crocodiles were probably present in Australia by 47,700-40,100 years ago, based remains found at South Walker Creek in northeast Queensland, close in time to the youngest records of Paludirex.
