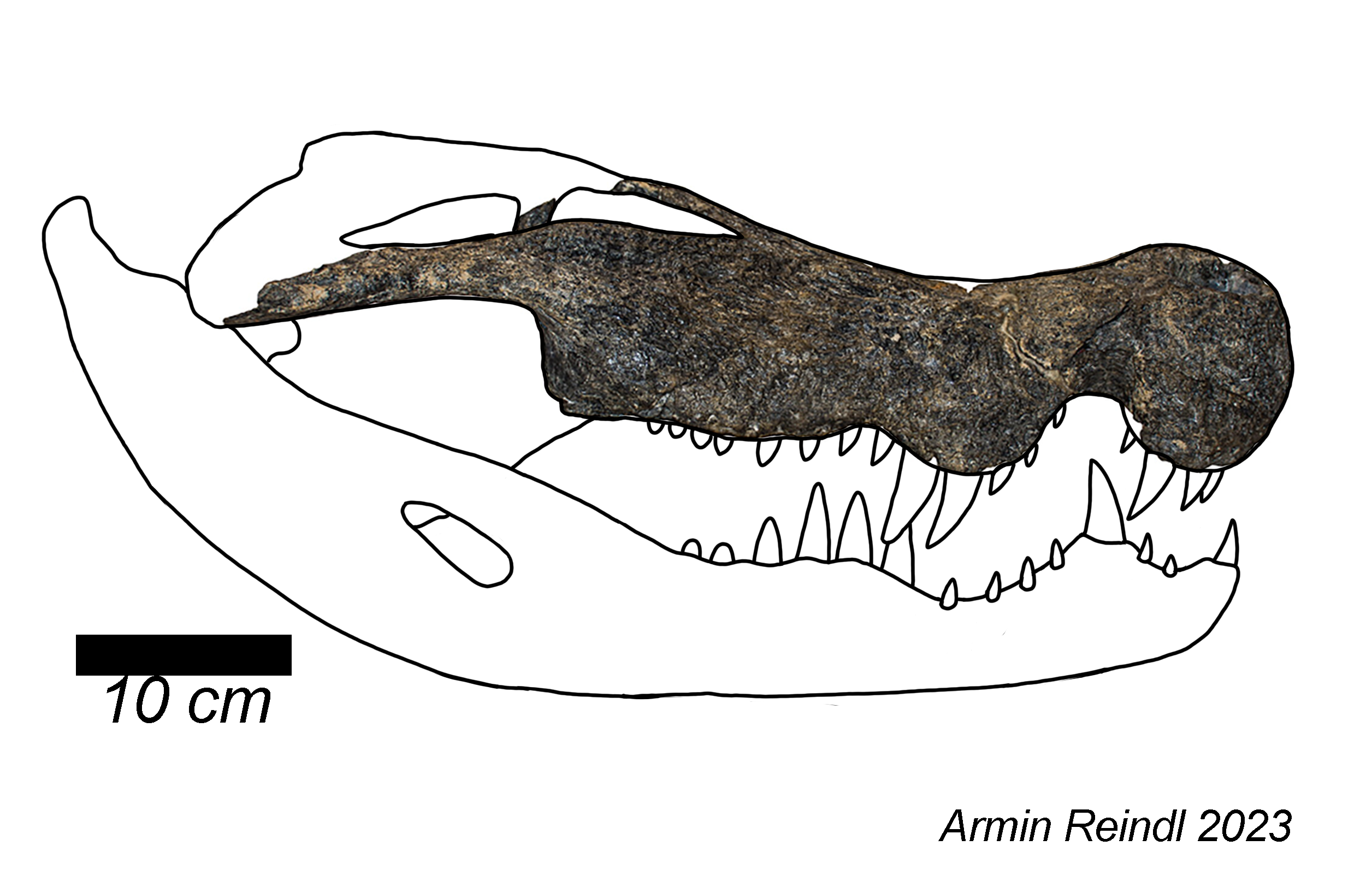

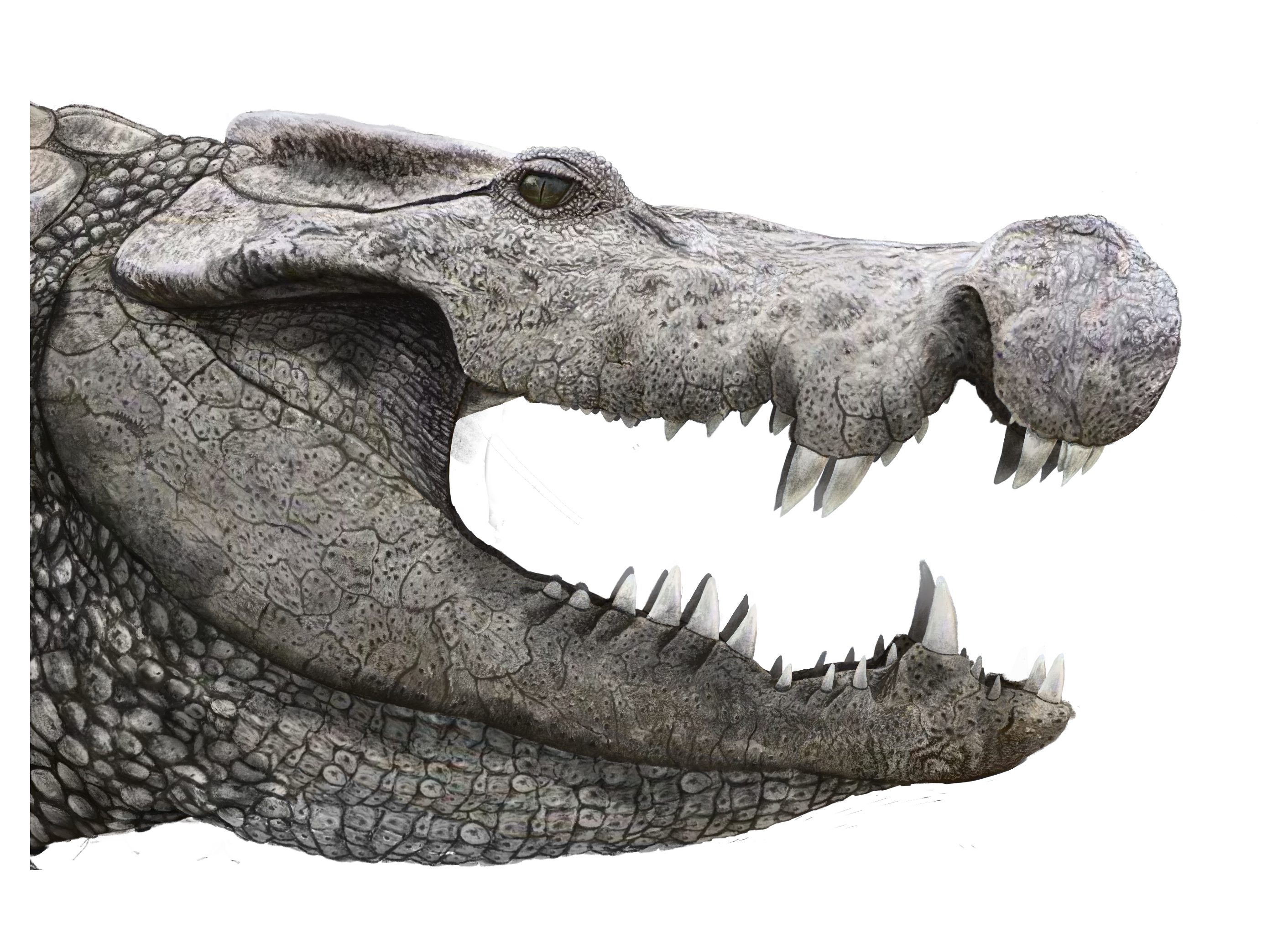
- Holotype skull of B. darrowi (top) and life restoration (bottom)

Scientific classification
- Kingdom: Animalia
- Phylum: Chordata
- Class: Reptilia
- Order: Crocodylia
- Clade: †Mekosuchinae
- Genus: †Baru; Willis et al., 1990

Species
- †Baru darrowi Willis et al., 1990 (type species); †Baru iylwenpeny Yates, Ristevski & Salisbury, 2023; †Baru wickeni Willis, 1997

= Baru =

Baru Temporal range: Late Oligocene - Late Miocene, 28.1–8 Ma

Extinct genus of reptiles

Baru, sometimes referred to as the cleaver-headed crocodile, is an extinct genus of Australian mekosuchine crocodilian. Its fossils have been found from various Late Oligocene and Miocene localities from across the Northern Territory and Queensland, indicating that Baru was a common genus during the late Paleogene and early Neogene. Three species are recognized, B. darrowi, B. iylwenpeny, and B. wickeni.

Baru was a large and powerful mekosuchine with an incredibly deep and robust skull and long teeth with compressed crowns that in the case of Baru darrowi are furthermore adorned with minute serrations. At a length of around 4 m (13 ft), it was among the largest crocodilians native to Australia at the time and the largest predator of its ecosystem. With dorsally oriented nostrils and eyes and a poor range of head movement, as well as its fossils being associated with freshwater environments, Baru is generally interpreted to have been a semi-aquatic ambush hunter, spending much of its day submerged in water waiting for prey.

While the skull of Baru broadly resembles that of modern crocodiles, its much more robust morphology suggests that it hunted somewhat differently. Willis and colleagues suggest that it inhabited shallower waters that were not suited to drown potential prey items as done by today's crocodiles. Instead, it may have relied on its powerful bite and compressed teeth to quickly incapacitate its prey, minimalizing the risk of it escaping during the ensuing struggle in the shallow waters. The bite of Baru is thought to have been powerful enough to take out even large mammals up to a weight of 300 kg (660 lb) and even other crocodilians, which were abundant in the environments Baru inhabited.

Although highly successful during the Oligocene and Miocene, Baru eventually fell victim to changes in Australia's climate at some point during the Late Miocene. One hypothesis suggests that the continent was hit by an especially devastating pulse of aridification that was severe enough to destroy the habitat preferred by Baru, before conditions improved again leading into the Pliocene. This may explain the drastic faunal turnover that occurred between the Miocene and Pliocene.

== History and naming ==
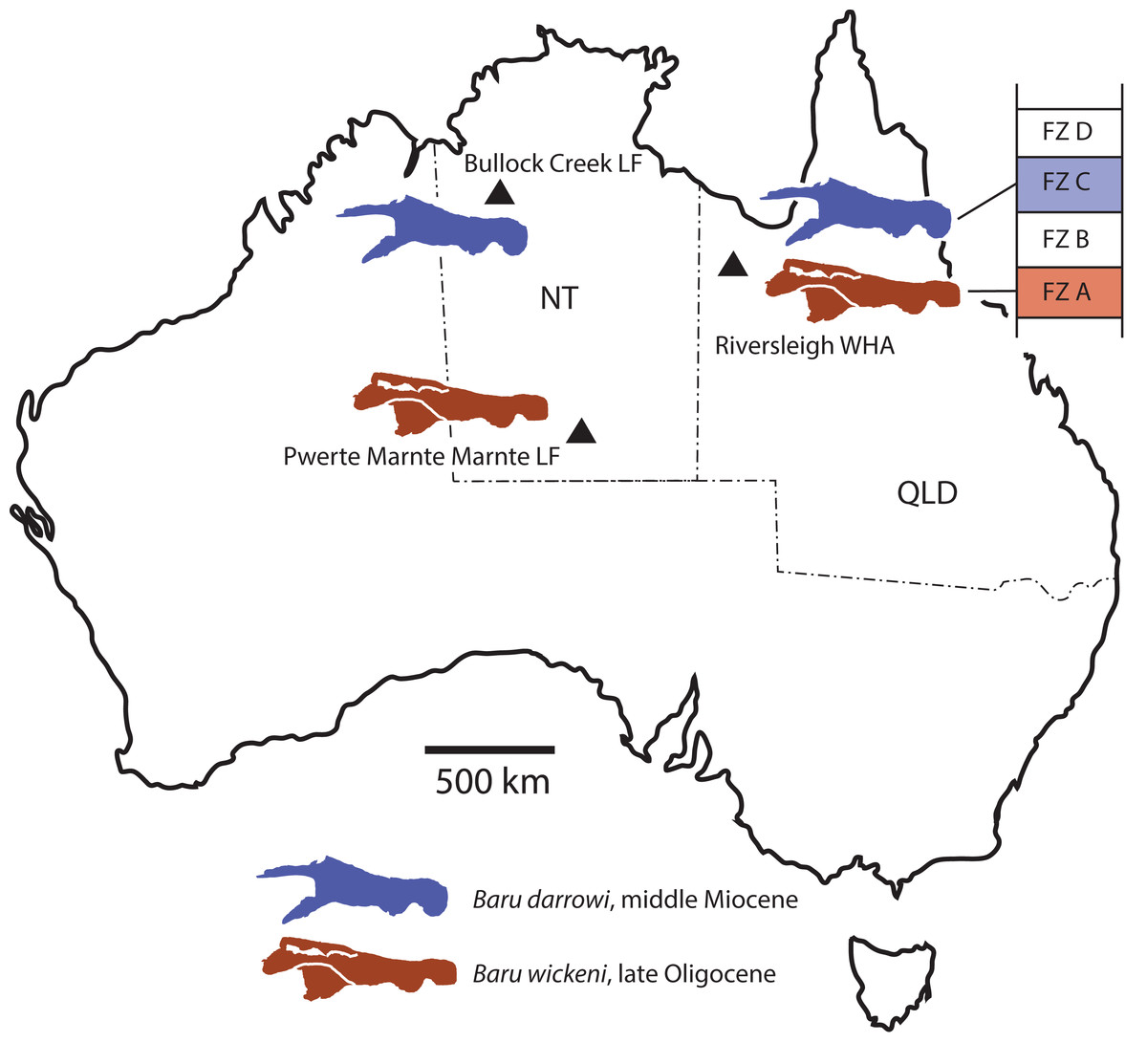
Distribution of Baru wickeni (red) and Baru darrowi (blue) across Australia.

Baru is among the first mekosuchines to have been described, with B. darrowi being named in 1990 on the basis of various fossils found in the Northern Territory and Queensland. The holotype, a partial rostrum, was collected from the Bullock Creek Local Fauna in the Northern Territory, with paratypes having been collected from Queensland's Riversleigh World Heritage Area. While small differences between the Bullock Creek and Riversleigh material had been recognized even then, the material was nevertheless assigned to a singular species. A difference in age between the two faunas was also already known, with the Bullock Creek LF dating to the Miocene whereas the specific strata of the Riversleigh WHA were Oligocene in age, but this gap in time was likewise not considered to be especially notably for a crocodilian. In 1997 Willis returned to the Riversleigh material thanks to the discovery of more material, now recognizing that they were distinct from the skull found at Bullock Creek and coining the name Baru wickeni in the process. Willis also described a third species of Baru in the same publication, which he named Baru huberi. The 90s and 2000s also saw the discovery of material at the Alcoota fossil site, but these finds though very complete were initially thought to have simply belonged to an established species, with only later works slowly beginning to recognize its distinctiveness. There had been fossil finds at the site predating even the description of Baru, going as far back as 1962, but given the poor understanding of Australasian crocodilians these isolated early remains were simply referred to Crocodylus at the time. Another major revision of the genus was published in 2017 by Adam M. Yates. Yates noted that the genus was poorly defined in the original 1990 description, revising the diagnosis while also discussing a variety of additional material collected in subsequent years. The paper resulted in two major changes, one being that it did not consider Baru huberi to actually represent a species of Baru. Instead, it and subsequent papers argued that it represents a basal member to an entirely different branch of mekosuchine and a 2024 paper eventually found it to be synonymous with Ultrastenos. The other major change concerned the range of the two accepted species, as material of Baru wickeni was described from Pwerte Marnte Marnte while new material of Baru darrowi was recovered from younger strata of the Riversleigh WHA. Furthermore, the Alcoota material is recognized as likely having belonged to a distinct species, which after initially being slated for a 2022 publication was unveiled in 2023 and given the name Baru iylwenpeny.

The word Baru is taken from a figure in the Dreamtime, specifically the believes held by the people of the East Arnhem Region. The figure Baru is described as a crocodile man by Willis and as the totem crocodile by George Pascoe Gaymarani. According to the stories, Baru gave names and laws to the land, the plants, the animals and the people of the East Arnhem Region.

== Species ==
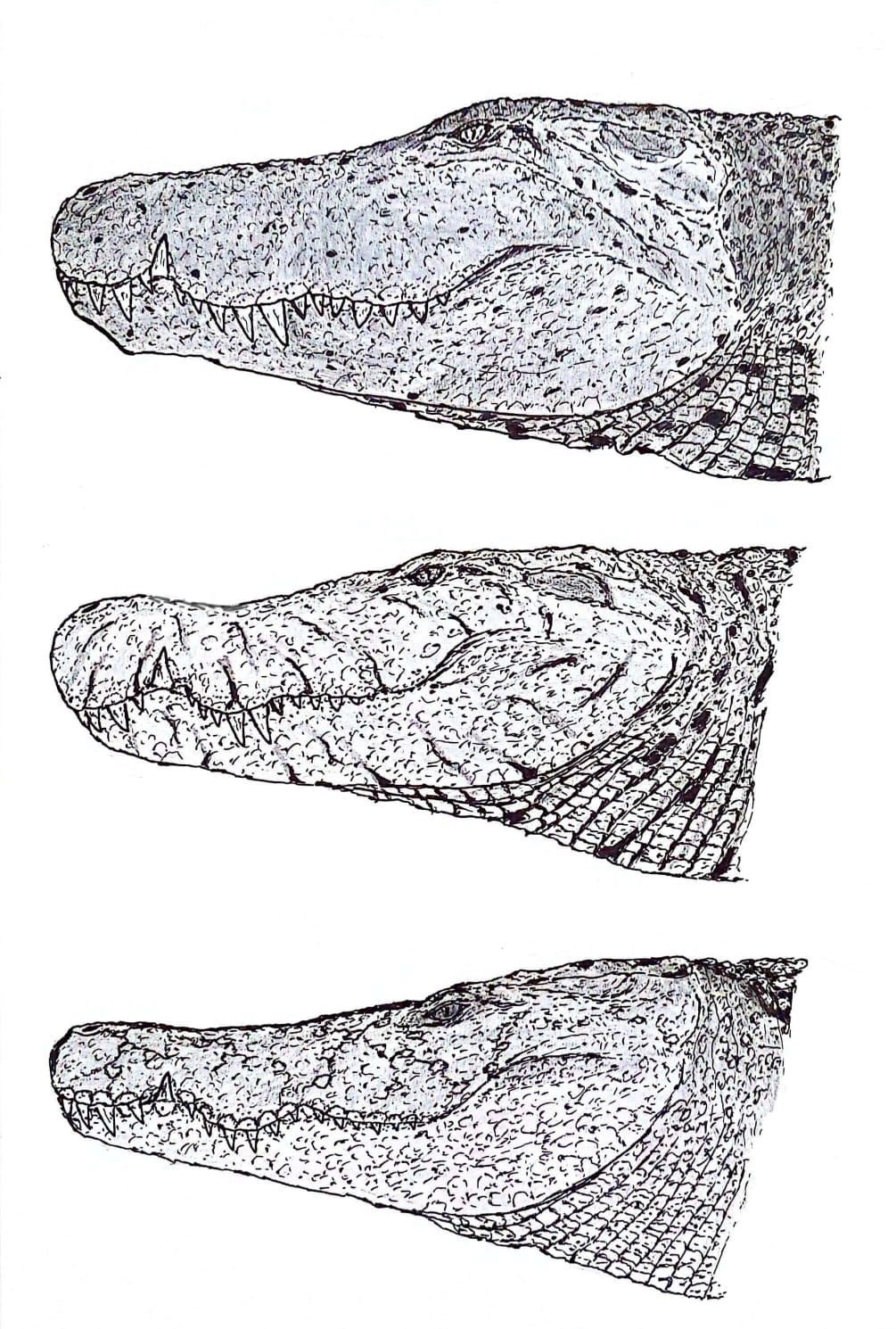
Reconstruction of Baru species. Top to bottom: B. iylwenpenny, B. darrowi, and B. wickeni.

- B. darrowi

The type species B. darrowi was initially only known from a singular skull discovered at Bullock Creek in the Northern Territory (discounting the material later referred to Baru wickeni or other mekosuchines). Later finds also confirmed its presence in the younger strata of the Riversleigh deposits. It was roughly the same size as Baru wickeni, reaching 4 m (13 ft) in length, and much younger, dating to the Middle Miocene. It is named after English actor Paul Darrow, a choice made by Willis in tribute of his contributions to the paleontological research of the Riversleigh WHA.

- B. iylwenpeny

This species is known from the Late Miocene Alcoota fossil site about 200km (125 miles) from Alice Springs, corresponding with the middle Late Miocene strata of the Waite Formation. It is known from multiple incomplete skulls discovered during the 2000s, including one exceptionally complete skull uncovered in 2009. The Alcoota material constitutes some of the best preserved material of not just Baru but of mekosuchines in general, with seven partial to nearly complete skulls, two full mandibles and dozens of less complete remains making it the most complete member of the group. Baru iylwenpeny is also noted for its robustness, exceeding even the other species of its genus. The species name, which is derived from Eastern Anmatyerr and pronounced "eel-OON-bin-yah", means "good at hunting".

- B. wickeni

B. wickeni is the older of the two species, living during the Late Oligocene and was described by Willis in 1997. Its remains have been collected from a variety of localities within the Northern Territory and Queensland, specifically Pwerte Marnte Marnte and the Riversleigh WHA. When first described, it was thought that B. wickeni was less robust than the type species. However this was later disproven by the discovery of NTM P91171-1, one of the most complete Baru skulls, which shows that both species had similarly proportioned skulls. Like the type species, B. wickeni was named for a supporter of the Riversleigh Research Project, specifically Tony Wicken, a curator at the University of New South Wales.

Previously, "Baru" huberi was thought to have been a species of this genus as well, but later studies have found that it was not especially close to Baru and instead was a synonym of Ultrastenos willisi, creating the combination Ultrastenos huberi. Ultrastenos is now thought to be closer to Mekosuchus and Trilophosuchus.

== Description ==
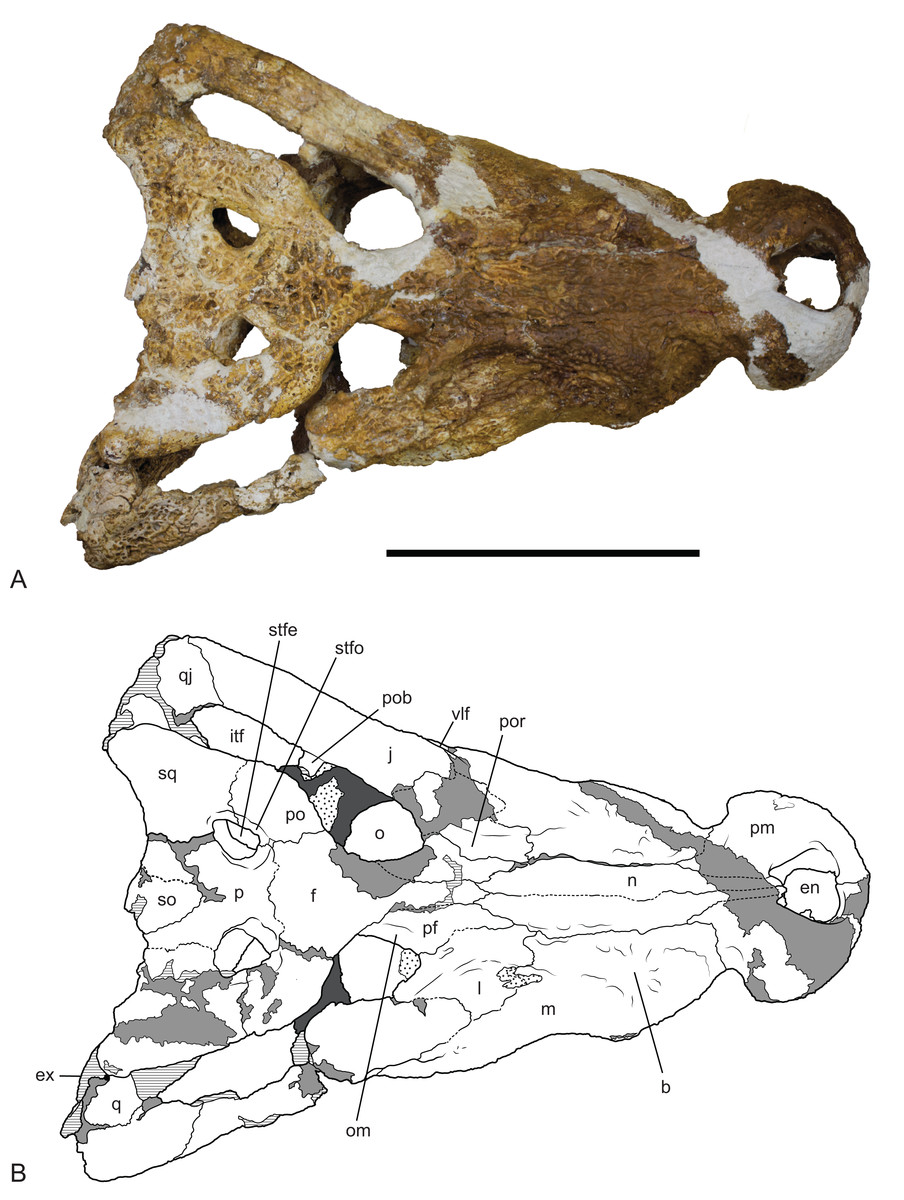
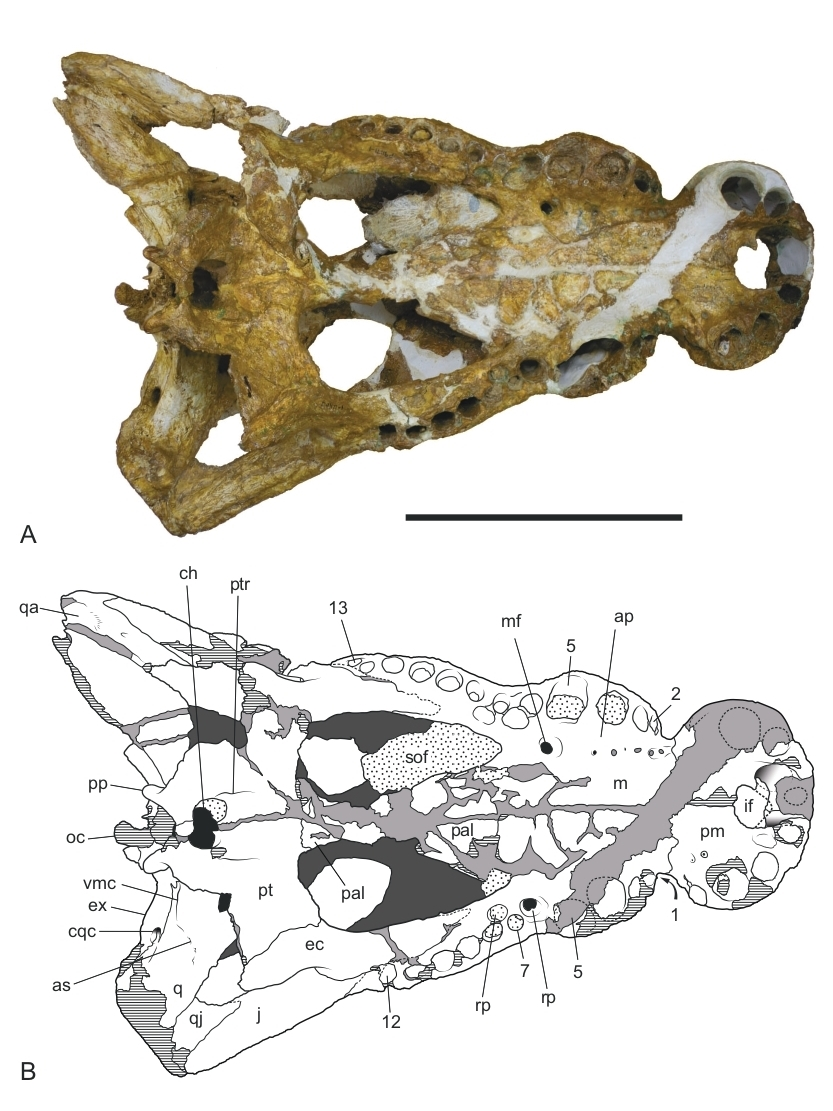
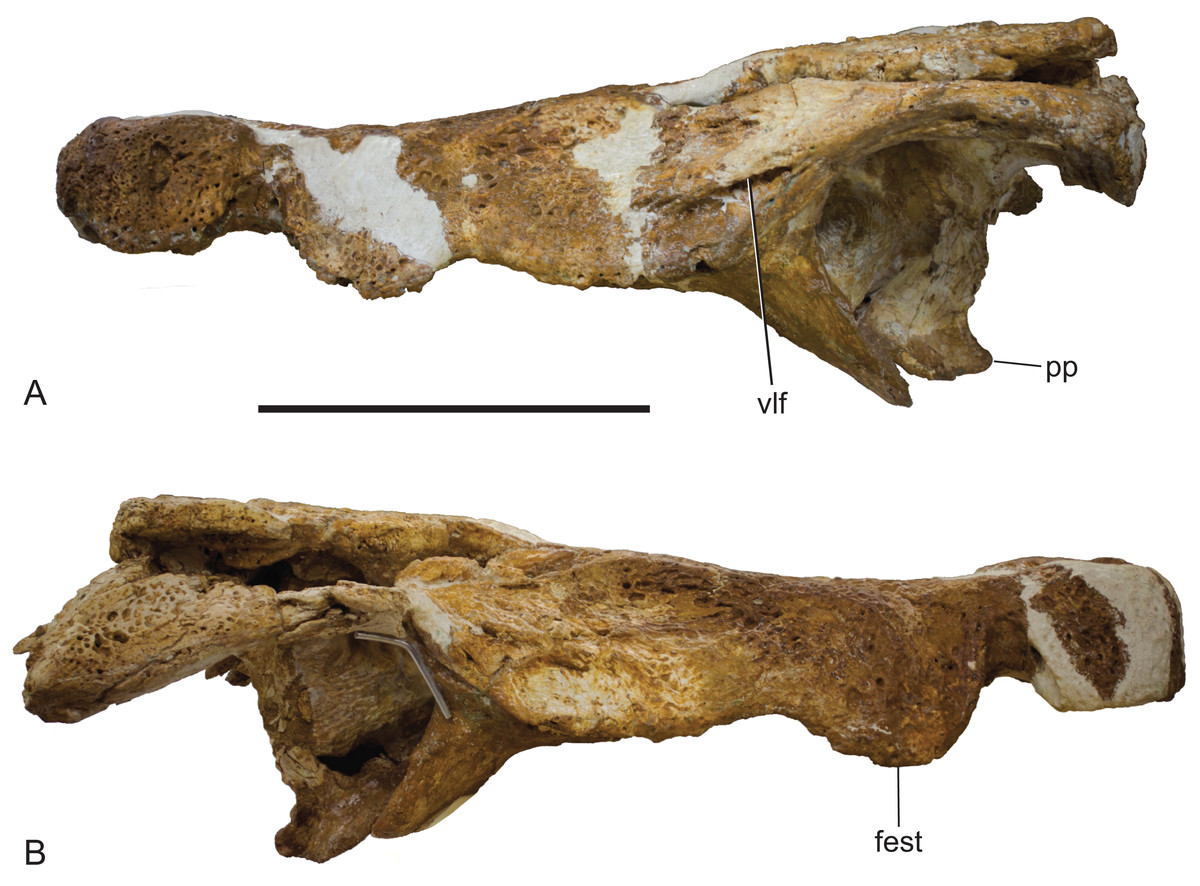
Baru skull NTM P91171-1 in multiple views

The skull of Baru was exceptionally broad and robustly built, with deep jaws and strongly curved, wave-like (festooned) jaw. The skull is trapezoid in cross section and described as altirostral by some researchers, setting it apart from the platyrostral snout shape typically associated with generalist crocodilians such as Paludirex, Kambara and Australosuchus. Viewed from the side the skull can be described as slightly wedge-shaped, although the cranium is almost as high just behind the nostrils as it is just before the eyes with a slight concavity between these regions. In dorsal view the skull is triangular, as typical for many crocodiles.

The premaxilla, the very tip of the snout, is a short, wide and robust element matching the proportions of the rest of the skull. The width of the nares stands out especially in Baru iylwenpeny, in which the width across the snout tip is over half the length of the maxillary section of the rostrum. However, most notable across all species is the profile of the premaxilla between the teeth and the nostrils, as it is very blunt and nearly vertical. This trait seems to have developed as the animal aged, with younger individuals still having more rounded snout tips. Originally, Baru wickeni was differentiated on the basis of this until material of older individuals was found, showing that the vertical premaxillary tip was found across both species. As in many other crocodilians, the contact between the premaxilla and maxilla is marked by a deep notch that receives the enlarged fourth tooth of the lower jaw. This notch not only marks the end of the premaxilla in side view, but also gives the element a D-shape when viewed from above. The nares allow it to quickly tell apart Baru darrowi from the other two species. While the external opening of the nares is roughly trapezoid in all species, in Baru darrowi it is entirely surrounded by the premaxilla. In contrast, the nares of Baru wickeni and Baru iylwenpeny are contacted by the paired nasal bones, which penetrate the upper surface of the premaxilla and contact the external nares. As expected from a semi-aquatic animal, the nares open dorsally, meaning upwards, which makes them well suited for keeping the head underwater over extended periods of time. In Baru iylwenpeny a small projection sits just before the nares, tho the size of it appears to vary between individuals.

The maxilla matches the premaxilla in its robust morphology, while also displaying a greatly festooned lower margin just behind the notch that separates it from the premaxilla. This region is described as a semilunate convexity by Yates, which essentially highlights that this part of the maxilla produces a very prominent rise that houses the first five maxillary teeth. In Baru darrowi and Baru wickeni the remaining teeth behind this first festoon of the upper jaw are placed along a much lower ridge that is much less prominent than those of the premaxilla and anterior maxilla. The same however does not apply to Baru iylwenpeny. While the first festoon is still prominent and in no way reduced, the teeth of the posterior maxilla sit on a festoon that is almost equally as prominent, making the previous section appear shallower by contrast and somewhat closing the gap seen in other species. Both Baru darrowi and Baru iylwenpeny show that the posterior branch of the dorsal alveolar nerve exits through an opening (a foramina) that is directed upwards near the upper margin of the maxilla, but it is uncertain if the same applies to Baru wickeni.

A series of ridges, crests and bosses are present across the skull of Baru. This includes a ridge located before the eyes atop the lacrimal bone. This preorbital ridge is best developed in Baru wickeni, in which it its flanked by a depression in the skull that runs along the side of said ridge. The same ridge can also be observed in Baru darrowi, however, in the more recent species it is not nearly as pronounced as in the Oligocene form, with Baru iylwenpeny lacking it altogether. Similarly, a deep ridge runs across the jugal and maxilla of Baru wickeni, which forms an overhanging flange. Much like the preorbital ridge, this flange is notably less prominent in Baru darrowi and absent in Baru iylwenpeny. While these ornamentations are most prominent in the oldest form, this does not necessarily mean that they were lost throughout the animals evolution, at least when following the interpretation that Baru iylwenpeny was actually the most basal species of the genus as recovered by Yates, Ristevski and Salisbury. On the inverse to these ridges, which are most prominent in Baru wickeni, the squamosal bone of Baru iylwenpeny and Baru darrowi features a sideways-facing boss that is absent in the oldest species. Baru iylwenpeny also possesses unique cranial sculpting, notably a pair of pits present atop the suture between prefrontal and frontal bone.

The supratemporal fenestrae are proportionally small, making up only around 12% of the length of the skull table. They are usually described as D-shaped, which sets them apart from those of Kalthifrons and Trilophosuchus which have elongated oval fenestrae, those of Kambara which are oval or those of Australosuchus and Volia which have more rectangular openings. The fenestrae are noted for being highly reduced in large individuals of Baru iylwenpeny, in which the surrounding bones of the skull table begin to overhang these openings more and more until they resemble a comma. The contribution of the supraoccipital bone to the skull table varies among species. It is a prominent contributor in Baru wickeni, unknown in Baru darrowi and barely present, sometimes even absent, in Baru iylwenpeny.

Much like the cranium, the lower jaw was a large and robust element with pronounced festooning. Although no complete mandible of Baru darrowi is known to science, there are some more fragmentary remains that allow to find similarities between it and the better understood Baru wickeni. As typical, the fourth tooth of the dentary is the largest and is followed by a depression in the jaw until the peak of the next festoon. In Baru iylwenpeny this depression, situated between the fourth and eleventh tooth, varies in dimensions, being deeper in some and shallower in other specimens. The sides of the mandibular ramus of Baru is heavily sculpted. On the surangular bone, the edge of this sculpted area is bordered by a ridge that projects towards the side in both Baru darrowi and Baru wickeni. This trait is not completely unique to Baru, as the same condition was independently evolved by Mekosuchus, a more distant relative among mekosuchines. Similar to the upper jaw, the mandible displays pronounced festooning. The mandibular symphysis, the region where both halves of the lower jaw fuse, extends beyond the fifth tooth of the lower jaw.

=== Dentition ===
Among the most striking features of Baru is its dentition. The teeth are slightly recurved and display a great disparity in tooth size (a feature typical for mekosuchines). All teeth of the premaxilla and the first six of the maxilla are pointed backwards. The overall shape of the teeth varies throughout the jaws. The anterior teeth, those preceding the sixth maxillary tooth, are generally described as tall and more conical, transitioning into lower teeth with a more rounded outline the further back one goes within the toothrow. Though the cross sections at the base of the anterior teeth tend to be circular, towards the apex of each tooth they become more laterally compressed, meaning that their sides are flattened which gives them a very different appearance compared to the teeth of modern crocodilians. More specifically, this gives the tooth crown a more D-shaped cross section, with the side facing out being more curved and the side facing inward being flatter. The more posterior teeth on the other hand do not show this stark contrast in cross section between base and crown and are instead consistently compressed, giving them an elliptical cross section. A variety of intermediate teeth are also present in the jaws of Baru, combining a more conical shape lacking curvature with the stout morphology. In juveniles all teeth are compressed.

The front and back of the teeth are marked by well developed cutting edges, so called carinae. This is also where one of the major differences between Baru wickeni and Baru darrowi can be observed. In Baru wickeni, the older of the two species, the cutting edges are smooth. However, those of the later Baru darrowi and Baru iylwenpeny showcase minute crenulation, a kind of very fine serration. In early research it is therefore written that Baru's teeth were ziphodont, however more recent publications argue that the crenulation is not developed enough to warrant them being described as such. The primary distinction between the crenulated teeth of Baru and the truly ziphodont teeth of Quinkana is that in the latter the teeth form well defined denticles that are separated by sharply defined sulci.

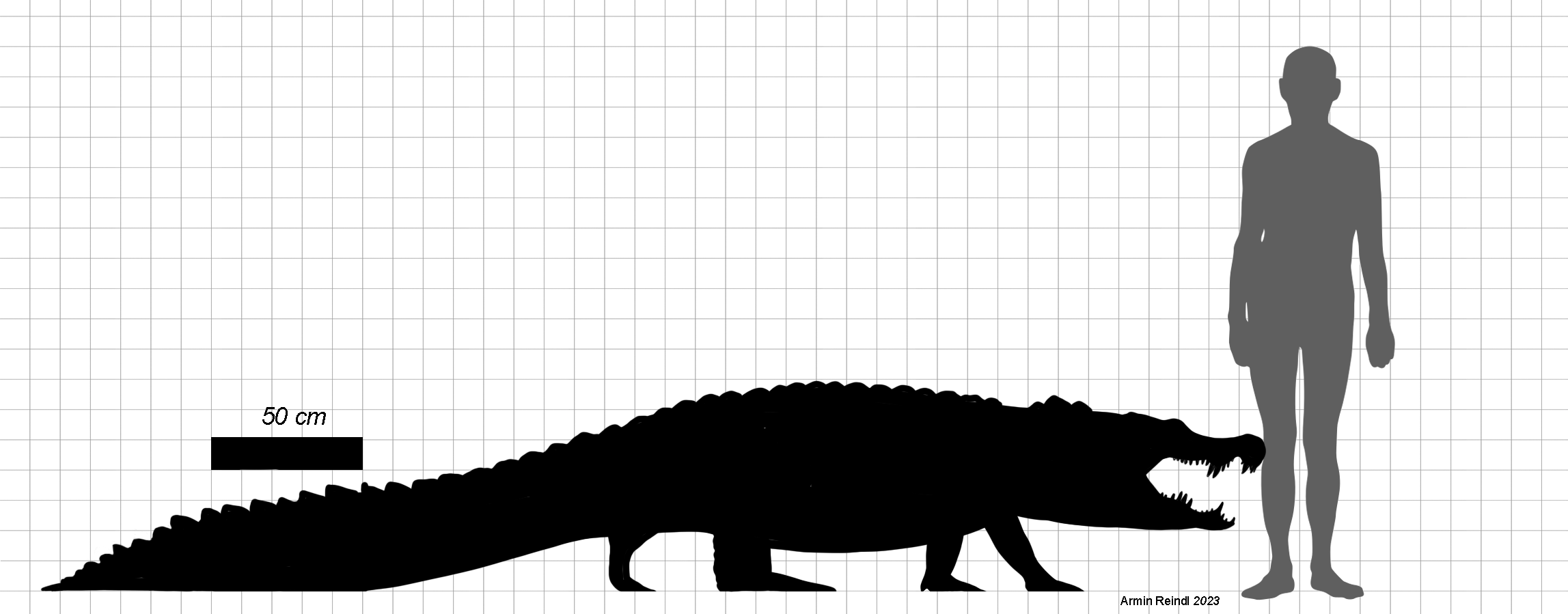
Size of Baru darrowi according to Willis, Murray and Megirian

The dentition of adult Baru consists of four to five teeth in each premaxilla, followed by 12 to 13 in each maxilla. While adult Baru darrowi and Baru wickeni only possess four teeth in each premaxilla, five teeth can be found in hatchlings. As Baru age, the second tooth of the premaxilla is gradually reduced until it is lost entirely. This appears to happen rather early in their life based on the discovery of young individuals already showcasing a reduced number of teeth. While this characterizes the older species, the condition is reversed in Baru iylwenpeny, which maintains five teeth throughout its life. Among the maxillary teeth, the sixth, seventh and eighth all serve to separate the different taxa within the genus, as the distance between them differs among the species. In Baru wickeni these gaps are wider than the seventh tooth socket is long, whereas in Baru darrowi they are shorter than any of the preceding tooth sockets. In large adults of Baru iylwenpeny meanwhile, the seventh and eight tooth are so closely spaced that they are almost in contact with each other. This is the result of the teeth being crowded together by the more prominent second festoon of the maxillary toothrow. Reception pits for the teeth of the lower jaw are situated lingual to the teeth of the maxilla, showcasing that in this part of the jaw the upper teeth overlapped the lower teeth.

The lower jaw contained 15 teeth similar to those of the upper jaw. As typically the case, the largest of these teeth is the fourth, which slides into the occlusal notch between the premaxilla and maxilla. Further back in the jaw, the 10th and 11th dentary teeth are confluent, which means they are situated right next to one another and not separated by a short gap like the others.

=== Size ===
Baru was among the larger mekosuchines, with the skulls of adults reaching a length of 50 cm (20 in). Although thought to have been smaller early on in its research history, later finds suggest that both Baru wickeni and Baru darrowi obtained similar lengths. Willis described the genus as being "moderately large" in his 1997 review of Australasian fossil crocodilians, providing an approximate length estimate of around 4 m (13 ft), with later works even suggesting that members of this genus could have reached lengths even greater than that. In particular, Baru iylwenpeny seemingly grew larger than its older relatives, with the largest known skull measuring 58.8 cm (23.1 in).

== Phylogeny ==
As one of the earliest described mekosuchines, Baru was crucial in scientists recognizing the presence of an endemic Australasian clade of crocodilians. During the initial description of Baru, the similarities to Quinkana and Pallimnarchus (now Paludirex) were already recognized, although material was too limited to fully grasp their relationship. Throughout the 90s and early 2000s, research on Australasian fossil crocodilians increased, leading to the description of a plethora of new forms and the gradual recognition of what would eventually become known as the Mekosuchinae. Although its placement in early studies varied depending on the author, its place within the family has gradually crystalized, with it now typically being considered to be a derived mekosuchine related to the likewise semi-aquatic Paludirex. In their 2018 study, Lee and Yates utilized stratigraphic, morphological and genetic information to determine the relationships of crocodilians, finding that Baru claded with Pallimnarchus and Kalthifrons as a sister group to the dwarf mekosuchines like Trilophosuchus and Mekosuchus. A more recent study by Ristevski et al. found somewhat similar results, except that the majority of their studies recovered Kalthifrons as a more basal taxon while Baru grouped with Paludirex and Quinkana.

The internal relationship for Baru is also rather stable. Baru wickeni is consistently found to be the basalmost member of the genus, not only due to its age but also the fact that the unserrated carinae of its teeth are the plesiomorphic (ancestral) condition. Baru darrowi and the then unnamed Alcoota species, both of which stem from younger strata, are often regarded as the two most derived members of the genus. As has been established by Yates in 2017 and confirmed by later studies, "Baru" huberi is not a species of Baru at all but a member of the genus Ultrastenos.

- - Mekosuchinae
    - Australosuchus†
    - - - Kambara taraina†
        - Kambara implexidens†
      - - Kambara murgonensis†
        - - - - Kalthifrons†
              - Paludirex†
            - - Baru wickeni†
              - - Baru darrowi†
                - Baru Alcoota†
          - - - Bullock Creek taxon†
              - "Baru" huberi†
            - - Volia†
              - - Mekosuchus†
                - - Trilophosuchus†
                  - Quinkana†
  - Longirostres

- - Crocodyloidea
    - "Crocodylus" megarhinus†
    - - Mekosuchinae
        - Kalthifrons aurivellensis†
        - - Kambara spp.†
          - - Australosuchus clarkae†
            - - - "Baru" huberi†
                - - Trilophosuchus rackhami†
                  - - Volia athollandersoni†
                    - - Mekosuchus whitehunterensis†
                      - - Mekosuchus sanderi†
                        - Mekosuchus inexpectatus†
              - - Paludirex spp.†
                - - - Baru darrowi†
                    - Baru wickeni†
                  - Quinkana spp.†
      - Crocodylidae

Different results where however recovered in the type description of Baru iylwenpeny. In these results, the relationship between Paludirex and Baru remained much the same as shown previously, except that the next closest taxon to these two genera was Mekosuchus, followed by Quinkana and Kalthifrons respectively. Australosuchus and Kambara were both recovered as a distinct clade at the base of the group, whereas all other mekosuchines were absent from the analysis. Another difference lies in the relationship between the individual species, with the results of the Baru iylwenpeny description finding that Baru darrowi and Baru wickeni were each others closest relatives, with Baru iylwenpeny being more basal. This contrasts with the results of Lee and Yates 2018, in which Baru iylwenpeny, then undescribed and unnamed, was the sister taxon to Baru darrowi. This would suggest that Baru iylwenpeny diverged before the other two species did, which is supported by a variety of anatomical traits including the fact that even adults retain five premaxillary teeth. There is however at present no fossil evidence linking the Late Miocene Baru iylwenpeny to its likeliest divergence time, which was during the Late Oligocene. Similarly, though there are parallels between this species and Paludirex, no evidence exists that would suggest that the two were closer than B. iylwenpeny was to other Baru species.

- - Crocodyloidea
    - "Crocodylus" megarhinus†
    - - Mekosuchinae
        - - Kambara†
          - Australosuchus†
        - - Kalthifrons†
          - - Quinkana†
            - - Mekosuchus†
              - - Paludirex†
                - - Baru iylwenpeny†
                  - - Baru wickeni†
                    - Baru darrowi†
      - Crocodylidae

== Paleobiology ==
=== Paleoecology ===
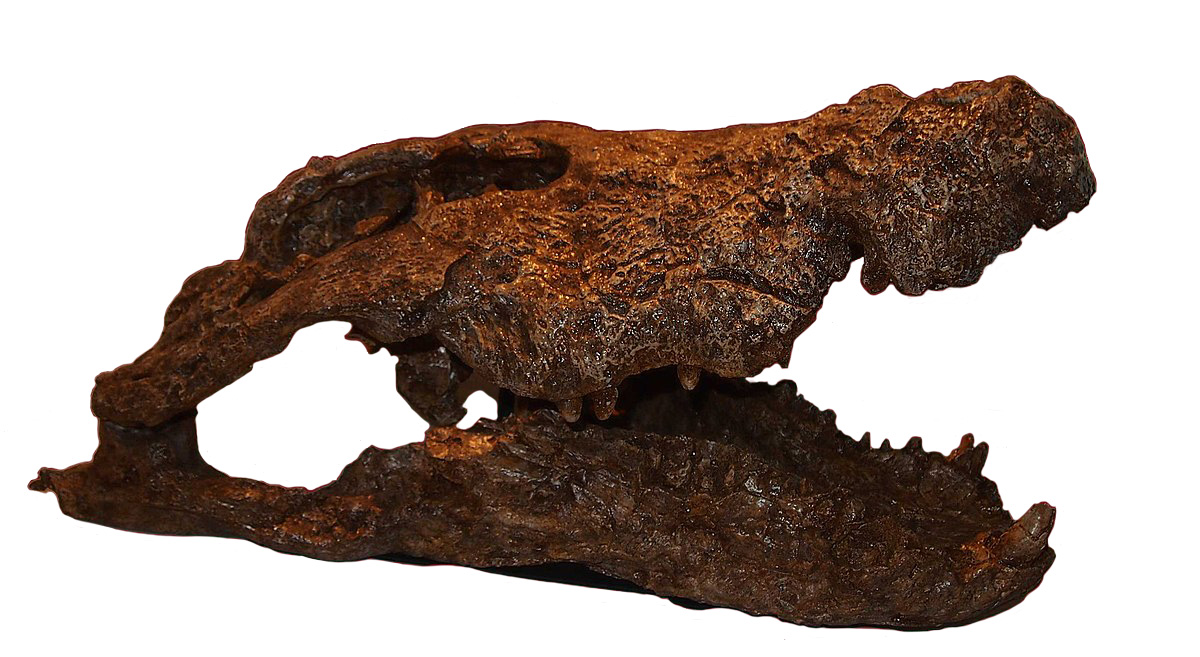
With its massive jaws Baru was capable of taking even large prey.

While the anatomy of Baru broadly resembles today's crocodiles, multiple key differences suggest that its hunting style differed significantly. The large, closely spaced and backwards directed teeth combined with the prominent festooning of the jaws suggest that the skull of Baru functioned much like a cleaver, delivering a devastating and incapacitating blow to any potential prey items. The way the festooning of the upper and lower jaw complement each other appears to be especially effective in driving the enlarged fourth dentary tooth into its prey, which leads to a combined use of shearing and breaking forces that would be capable of penetrating even tough hide, armored skin or bony armor. During capture, the large teeth likely served to restrain prey as the jaws close.

The minute serrations present on the teeth of Baru darrowi may have been a further refinement of this hunting method, serving to cut through flesh and other tissue as the struggling prey tries to resist the bite of the crocodilian. In addition to the forces generated by the prey itself while trying to escape, minor movement of the jaws could also contribute to the effectiveness of this method. Overall the dentition of Baru appears to be well suited for rapid immobilisation of even large prey. Willis and colleagues speculate that Baru darrowi may have been capable of taking down animals up to 300 kg (660 lb) in weight based on its great size, robust build and prey tackled similarly sized saltwater crocodiles. This would have made it an effective hunter of contemporary mammal megafauna and, due to its ability to even pierce armored hide, also other crocodilians. There are numerous fossils from both Bullock Creek and Riversleigh that bear the bite marks of crocodilians, possibly Baru. Among those fossil species evidently attacked by the crocodiles of Bullock Creek are flightless birds like Dromornis and Emuarius as well as large marsupials such as Neohelos.

Willis reasons that while Baru was semi-aquatic and likely hunted from the water's edge, it inhabited shallower waters than today's saltwater crocodiles, rendering the typical method of dispatching prey by drowning it less effective. While modern crocodiles have the advantage of being able to release half-drowned prey in deeper waters to adjust their grasp on the struggling animal, Baru may not have had this advantage as prey could have escaped much more easily in the shallows. Instead, Willis suggests that Baru's habitat meant that it had to take out prey more quickly, thus leading to a powerful bite that would immobilize its target and minimize the risk of escape.

There may have been a significant difference in the hunting method of young individuals compared to large adults, at least within Baru iylwenpeni. Yates and colleagues note that juveniles of this species show teeth that are much more compressed than in adults, in which the anterior teeth become more circular in cross section while the posterior teeth only retain mild flattening. Though the team does not dive deeper into the implications of this shift, they suggest that this likely affected either the precise method used to acquire prey or the size of prey items.

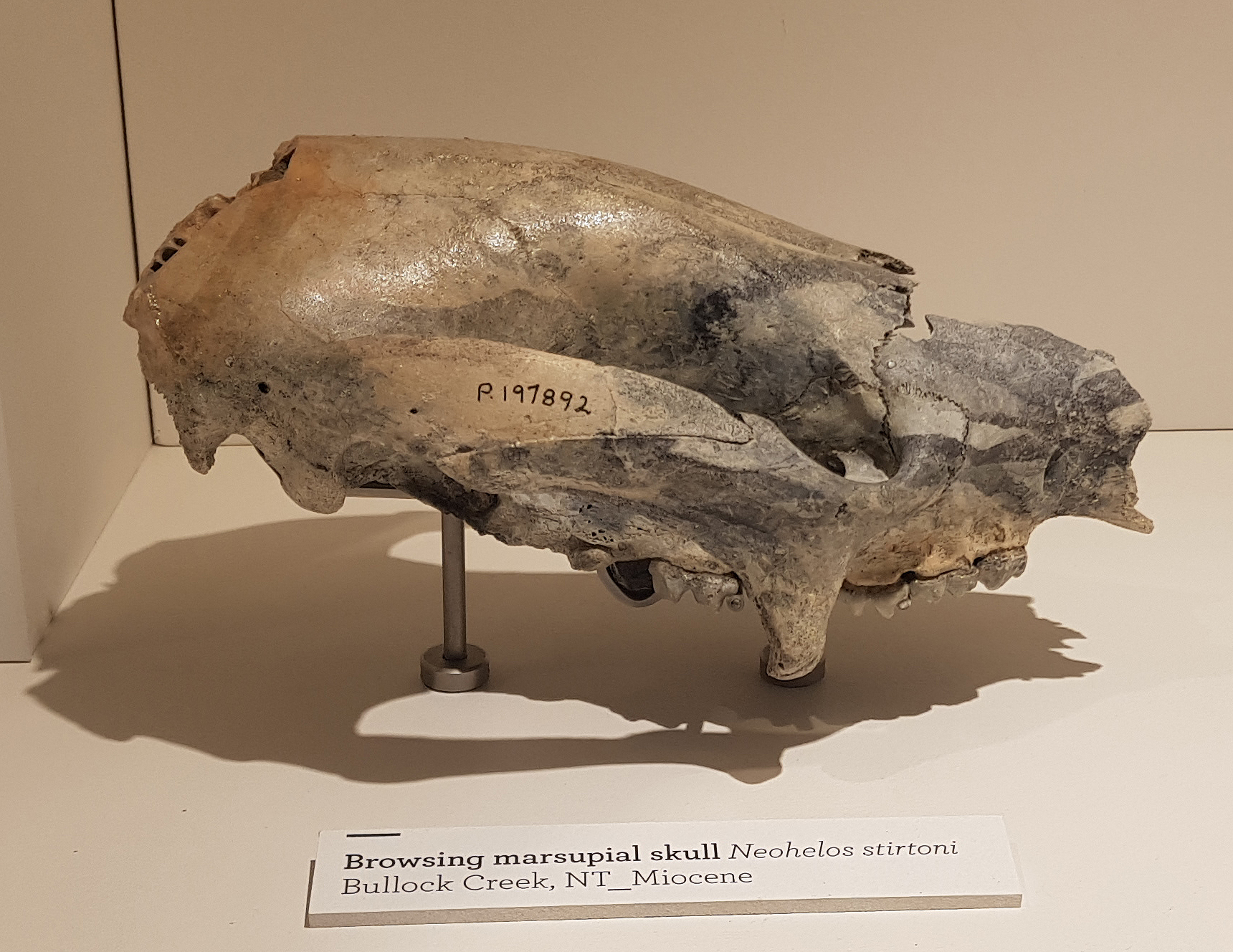
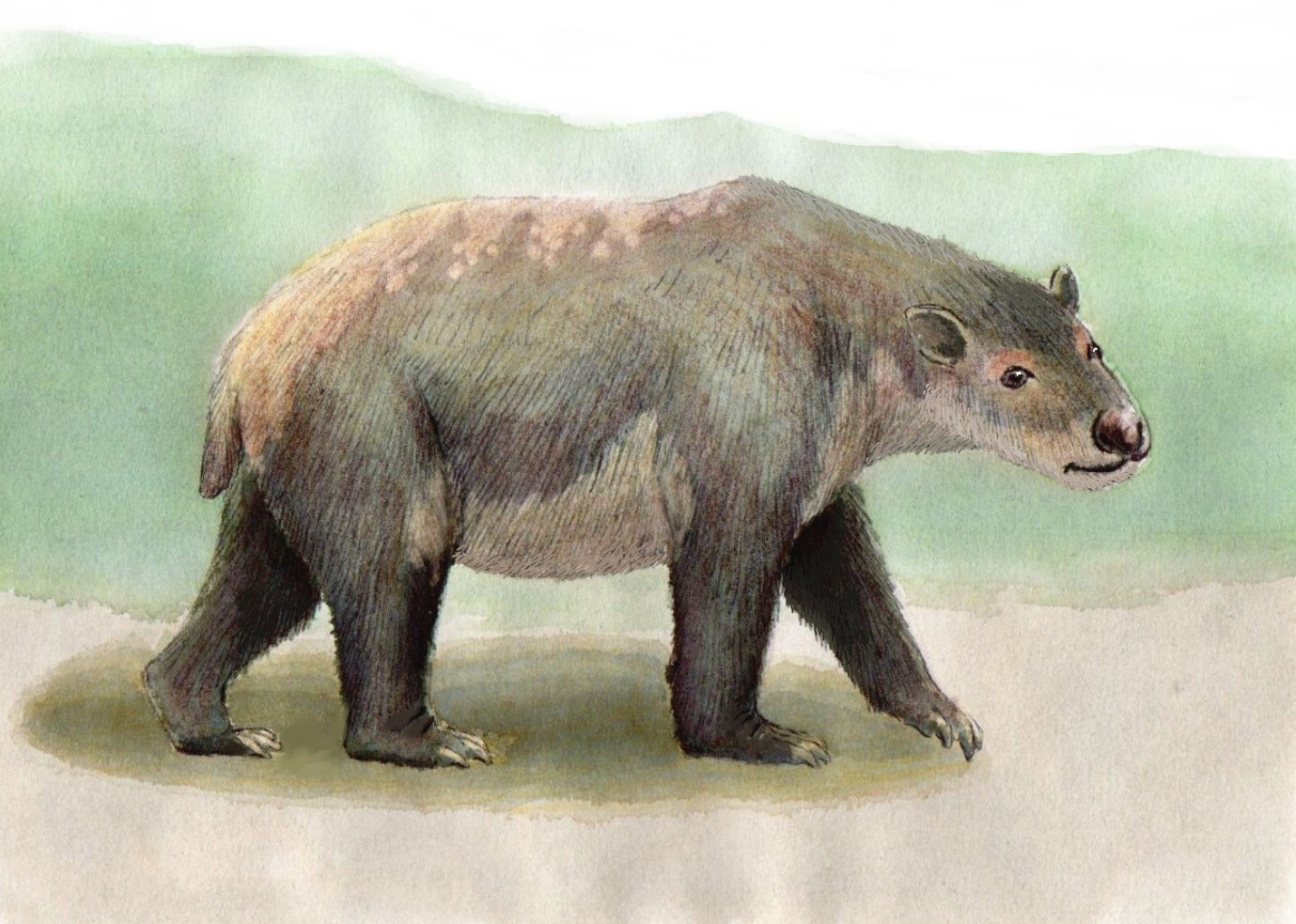
Baru could have preyed on animals like the early diprotodontids Neohelos (top) and Silvabestius (bottom).

In a 2026 study Hoffman and colleagues raise the point that although generally speaking semi-aquatic, Baru does show some adaptations that suggest it would have been somewhat more terrestrial than modern crocodilians. Specifically, the team highlights that the ratio of the medulary cavity to cortical bone in the limb bones of Baru wickeni and Baru darrowi is significantly altered compared to extant species, in which the cavity is smaller and the cortical bone thicker to aid in buoyancy control. In the case of Baru darrowi in particular the medulary cavity is much larger and the resulting ratio closer to animals like the nimble Terrestrisuchus. While this tentatively suggests some degree of greater terrestrialisation, the team does highlight that a number of factors such as the section the sample was taken from and the age of the animals might have impact on the result. They further note that in spite of this Baru still displays the clear semi-aquatic adaptations in the skull noted by prior authors, positing that the animal's terrestrial habits could have been focused on traversing land while switching from one body of water to another.

=== Paleoenvironment ===
While the precise hunting method of Baru is thought to have differed from modern crocodiles, its nevertheless thought to have been a semi-aquatic animals. The position of the nares and eyes, both of which are directed upward rather than sideways, indicate that Baru was an animal that spent much of its time submerged in water. This is further supported by the fact that species of this genus are consistently in freshwater environments. Another supporting factor stems from its head mobility. The atlas-axis complex, the first vertebrae of the neck, indicate that its mobility was no greater than that of a saltwater crocodile, which is adequate for a semi-aquatic animal but limiting for a terrestrial hunter. It is further pointed out that the specialised hunting method inferred for this taxon would be unsuited for a terrestrial hunter and much to energy inefficient.

Baru wickeni is exclusively known from the earlier strata of the Riversleigh deposits, specifically the D Site and Whitehunter Site within Faunal Zone A. Faunal Zone A is well known for having featured extensive freshwater ecosystems including lakes and rivers, which were home to a variety of crocodilians, turtles and lungfish. Crocodilians were especially diverse at the Whitehunter Site, with three to four other mekosuchines being discovered there in addition to Baru wickeni. These include Quinkana, which is commonly thought to have been a terrestrial hunter given its ziphodont dentition and altirostral skull, Mekosuchus whitehunterensis, another potentially terrestrial animal and Ultrastenos. Among the three, Ultrastenos is the most similar to Baru wickeni, also possessing a platyrostral skull indicative of semi-aquatic habits. However unlike Baru wickeni, Ultrastenos was noticeably smaller and thus unlikely to have competed with the larger predator.

The occurrence of Baru wickeni at the Pwerte Marnte Marnte fossil site represents the southernmost record of the species and genus and confirms that Baru was found within the Lake Eyre Basin. Prior to this discovery, it was hypothesized that the Riversleigh WHA was separated from the Lake Eyre Basin by some factor of geography like a dessert, preventing Baru from ranging further south and isolating Australosuchus. The presence of Baru wickeni at Pwerte Marnte Marnte however confirms that Baru was indeed able to reach the basin, and the lack of overlap with Australosuchus must have been caused by other reasons. Yates suggests that climate may have been a factor, and that Baru was simply not cold-resistant enough to spread beyond the 25° South, whereas Australosuchus was better adapted to handling lower temperatures than its relative.

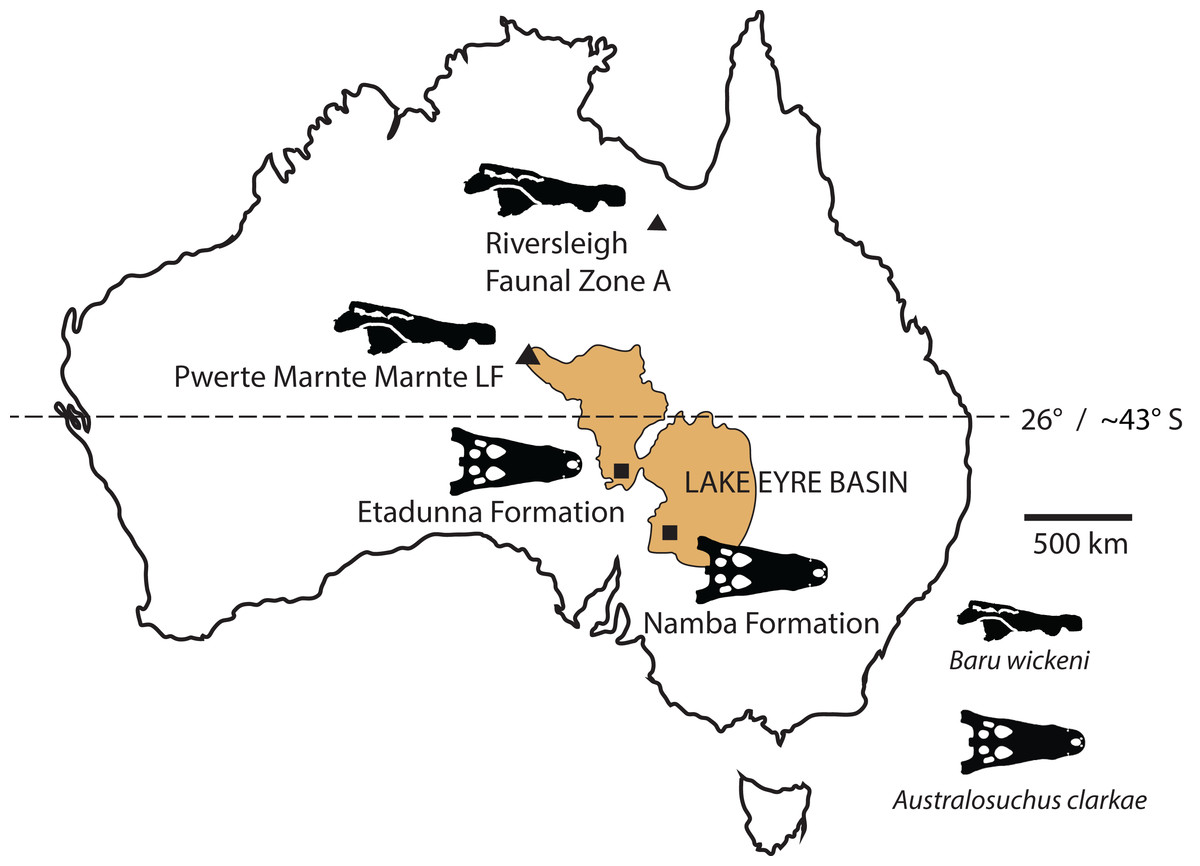
Distribution of Baru wickeni compared to that of Australosuchus.

Baru darrowi only appeared later in the fossil record during the Miocene, with fossils being found from Bullock Creek and Faunal Zone C of the Riversleigh WHA. Crocodilians are rarer in younger zones of the Riversleigh, but not absent. This is exemplified by the Ringtail Site, where Baru darrowi material has been collected from. Like the Whitehunter Site of the Oligocene, the Ringtail Site preserves a highly diverse collection of mekosuchines, including Mekosuchus sanderi and Trilophosuchus rackhami, two dwarf species that are thought to have filled very different niches compared to Baru. The Ringtail Site is thought to be roughly coeval with the type locality of this species, Bullock Creek. Both faunas shared several species, like the thylacine Mutpuracinus, the marsupial lion Wakaleo and the giant wombat Neohelos. The Bullock Creek locality has been interpreted as a floodplain covered by riparian woodland, possibly dry vine forest surrounded by more open woodlands. These woodlands are thought to have been dotted by a variety of freshwater systems ranging from shallow streams to slow moving waters like deep pools and billabongs. Other crocodilians were also present in this locality, notably the unnamed "Bullock Creek taxon", Harpacochampsa, which may have been a type of gharial, and a species of Quinkana, Q. timara.

Less is known about the crocodilian fauna of the Alcoota fossil site, but based on differences in the skull table it could be established that at least one other species shared its environment with Baru iylwenpeny. This crocodilian, pending description, was smaller, with a skull length of less than 30 cm (12 in). Although little is known about this animal, it has been proposed that it was a close relative to Ultrastenos.

The geographic ranges of both B. wickeni and B. darrowi indicate that these crocodilians were widespread across the freshwater systems of northern to central Australia during relatively narrow timeframes. Baru wickeni ranges from the Riversleigh WHA in the east to Pwerte Marnte Marnte in the south-west during the Late Oligocene, whereas Baru darrowi ranges from the Riversleigh to Bullock Creek during the Middle Miocene, the latter being separated by a distance of 800 km (500 mi). As suggested by Willis, Baru may have inhabited shallower waters within its range, such as freshwater lakes and shallow streams.

=== Extinction ===
While widespread and successful throughout the Late Oligocene and most of the Miocene, there are no records of Baru following those of Baru iylwenpeny, not even from the Ongeva Local Fauna which shares much of its fauna with the assemblage that yielded the youngest Baru remains. As the Ongeva Local Fauna represents the Miocene-Pliocene boundary, it is assumed that Baru went extinct during the Late Miocene at some point after the deposition of the Alcoota Local Fauna roughly eight million years ago. This extinction may coincide with the disappearance of what is simply referred to as the "B. huberi lineage" by Yates and colleagues, a poorly understood group that includes Ultrastenos which coexisted with Baru wickeni, the "Bullock Creek taxon" and the unnamed dwarf form recognized from Alcoota in 2023.

The extinction of these animals was likely tied to widespread global cooling and its consequences on the climate of Australia. As ocean temperatures dropped and the Middle Miocene climate optimum ended, rainforests began to retreat across the continent and conditions grew gradually more arid. While the early stages of this aridification were likely responsible for the first major wave of extinctions in Australia's endemic crocodilian fauna, the effects on mekosuchines as a whole were not immediate. Pliocene strata still recorded a high total diversity in crocodilians and it was not until the Pleistocene that the group disappeared from the mainland for good. However, Yates and colleagues do highlight how the two periods are clearly the stage of a major faunal turnover that saw mekosuchines now competing with newly arrived members of the genus Crocodylus.

A possible reason for the sudden extinction of Baru and other Miocene mekosuchines may be that Australia underwent an especially harsh but brief period of aridity that was severe enough to temporarily destroy the preferred habitat of these animals. This is supported by a near total absence of fossil pollen recorded for that time, which is generally attributed to just such a dry period. With the only areas that saw increased rainfall falling outside of the range of Baru, the destruction of these inland habitats could have wiped out the genus before conditions improved again, allowing for other mekosuchines like Kalthifrons and Paludirex to fill the empty niches alongside species of Crocodylus.
