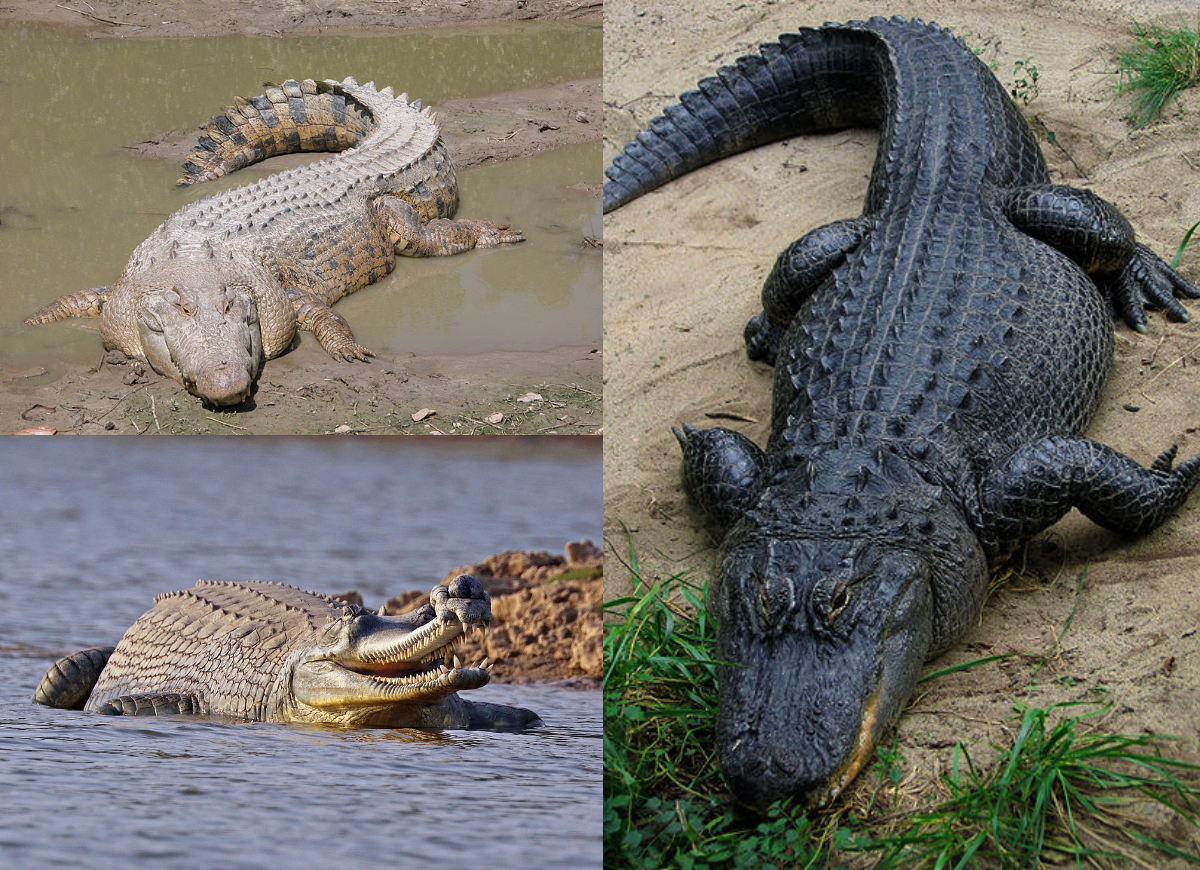
- Clockwise from top-left: saltwater crocodile (Crocodylus porosus), American alligator (Alligator mississippiensis), and gharial (Gavialis gangeticus)

Scientific classification
- Kingdom: Animalia
- Phylum: Chordata
- Class: Reptilia
- Clade: Pseudosuchia
- Clade: Crocodylomorpha
- Clade: Eusuchia
- Order: Crocodylia; Owen, 1842

Subgroups
- †Asiatosuchus; †Brachyuranochampsa; †"Crocodylus" acer; †"Crocodylus" affinis; †Pristichampsus; †Prodiplocynodon; †Mekosuchinae; †Planocraniidae?; Alligatoroidea; Alligatoridae; Longirostres; Gavialoidea; Gavialidae; Crocodyloidea; Crocodylidae
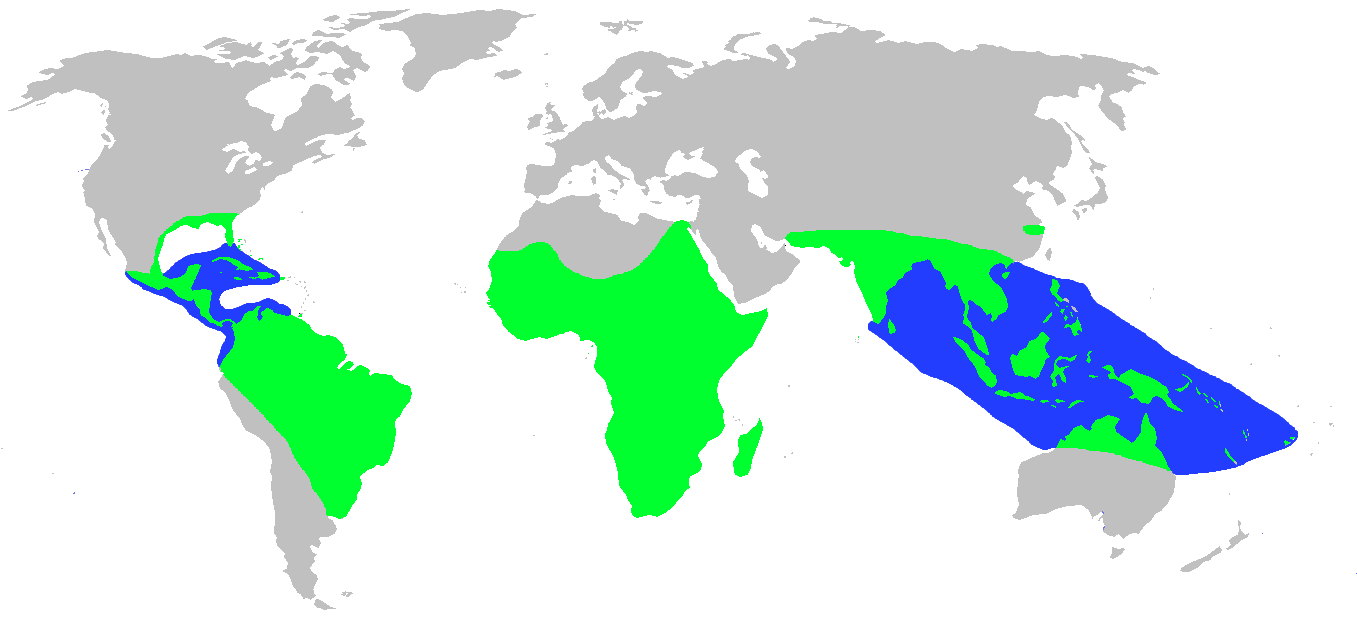
- Crocodylia distribution on land (green) and at sea (blue)

Synonyms
- Crocodilia Owen, 1842

= Crocodylia =

Crocodylia Temporal range: Late Cretaceous – Present

Order of reptiles

Crocodylia or Crocodilia (/krɒkəˈdɪliə/) is an order of semiaquatic, predatory reptiles that are known as crocodilians. They appeared 83.5 million years ago in the Late Cretaceous period (Campanian stage) and are the closest living relatives of birds, as the two groups are the only known survivors of the Archosauria. Members of the crocodilian total group, the clade Pseudosuchia, appeared about 250 million years ago in the Early Triassic period, and diversified during the Mesozoic era. The order includes the true crocodiles (family Crocodylidae), the alligators and caimans (family Alligatoridae), and the gharial and false gharial (family Gavialidae). Although the term "crocodiles" is sometimes used to refer to all of these families, the term "crocodilians" is less ambiguous.

Extant crocodilians have flat heads with long snouts and tails that are compressed on the sides, with their eyes, ears, and nostrils at the top of the head. Alligators and caimans tend to have broader U-shaped jaws that, when closed, show only the upper teeth, whereas crocodiles usually have narrower V-shaped jaws with both rows of teeth visible when closed. Gharials have extremely slender, elongated jaws. The teeth are conical and peg-like, and the bite is powerful. All crocodilians are good swimmers and can move on land in a "high walk" position, traveling with their legs erect rather than sprawling. Crocodilians have thick skin covered in non-overlapping scales and, like birds, have a four-chambered heart and lungs with unidirectional airflow.

Like other (non-avian) reptiles, crocodilians are ectotherms or 'cold-blooded'. They are found mainly in the warm and tropical areas of the Americas, Africa, Asia, and Oceania, usually occupying freshwater habitats, though some can live in saline environments and even swim out to sea. Crocodilians have a largely carnivorous diet; some species like the gharial are specialized feeders while others, like the saltwater crocodile, have generalized diets. They are generally solitary and territorial, though they sometimes hunt in groups. During the breeding season, dominant males try to monopolize available females, who lay their eggs in holes or mounds and, like many birds, they care for their hatched young.

Some species of crocodilians, particularly the Nile crocodile, are known to have attacked humans, which through activities that include hunting, poaching, and habitat destruction are the greatest threat to crocodilian populations. Farming of crocodilians has greatly reduced unlawful trading in skins of wild-caught animals. Artistic and literary representations of crocodilians have appeared in human cultures around the world since at least Ancient Egypt.

== Spelling and etymology ==
"Crocodilia" and "Crocodylia" have been used interchangeably for decades, starting with Karl Patterson Schmidt's re-description of the group from the formerly defunct term Loricata. Schmidt used the older term "Crocodilia", based on Richard Owen's original name for the group. Heinz Wermuth chose "Crocodylia" as the proper name, basing it on the type genus Crocodylus (Laurenti, 1768). Dundee, in a revision of many reptilian and amphibian names, argued strongly for "Crocodylia". Following the advent of cladistics and phylogenetic nomenclature, a more-solid justification for one spelling over the other was proposed.

Prior to 1988, Crocodilia was a group that encompassed the modern-day animals, as well as their more-distant relatives that are now classified in the larger groups Crocodylomorpha and Pseudosuchia. Under its current definition as a crown group, rather than a stem-based group, Crocodylia is now restricted to the last common ancestor of today's crocodilians and all of its descendants, living or extinct.

Crocodilia appears to be a Latinism of the Greek word κροκόδειλος (krokódeilos), which means both lizard and Nile crocodile. Crocodylia, as coined by Wermuth in regards to the genus Crocodylus, appears to be derived from the Ancient Greek κρόκη (kroke)—meaning shingle or pebble—and δρîλος or δρεîλος (dr(e)ilos), meaning worm. The name may refer to the animal's habit of resting on the pebbled shores of the Nile.

== Phylogeny and evolution ==
=== Origins from pseudosuchians ===
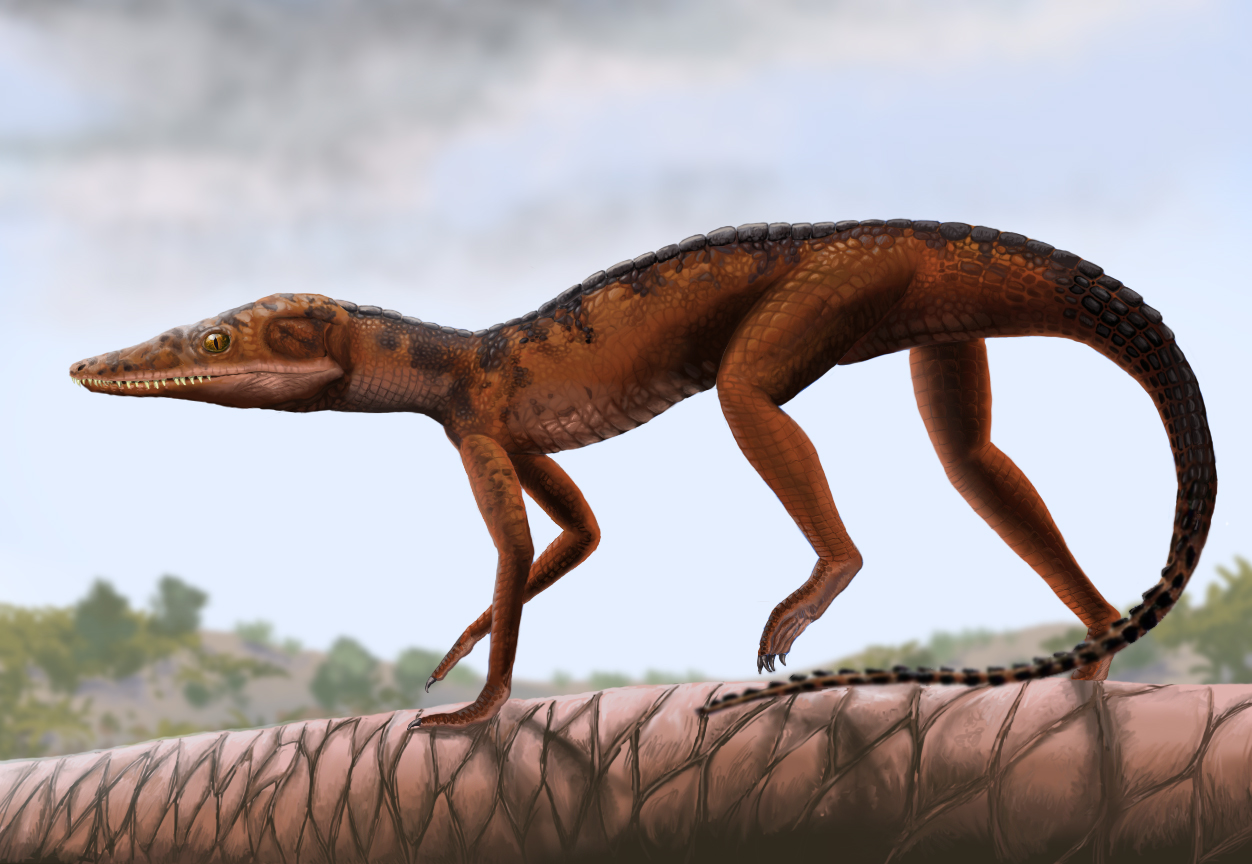
Reconstruction of Litargosuchus, a sphenosuchian

Crocodilians and birds are members of the clade Archosauria. Archosaurs are distinguished from other reptiles particularly by two sets of extra openings in the skull; the antorbital fenestra located in front of the animal's eye socket and the mandibular fenestra on the jaw. Archosauria has two main groups: the Pseudosuchia (crocodilians and their relatives) and the Avemetatarsalia (dinosaurs, pterosaurs, and their relatives). The split between these two groups is assumed to have happened close to the Permian–Triassic extinction event, which is informally known as the Great Dying.

Crocodylomorpha, the group that later gave rise to modern crocodilians, emerged in the Late Triassic. The most-basal crocodylomorphs were large, whereas the ones that gave rise to crocodilians were small, slender, and leggy. This evolutionary grade, the "sphenosuchians", first appeared around Carnian of the Late Triassic. They ate small, fast prey and survived into the Late Jurassic. As the Triassic ended, crocodylomorphs became the only surviving pseudosuchians.

=== Early crocodyliform diversity ===
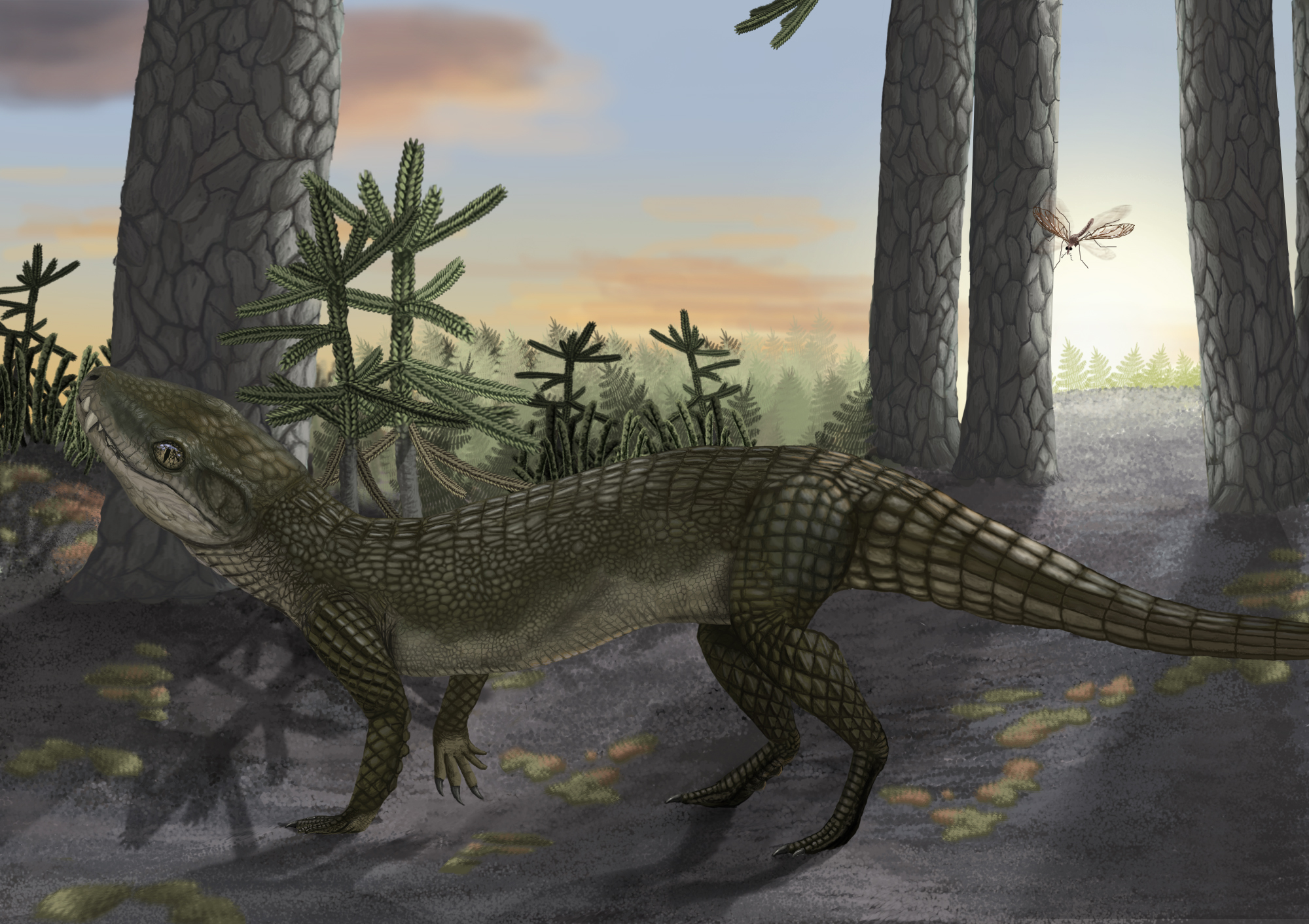
Life restoration of Pakasuchus

During the early Jurassic period, dinosaurs became dominant on land and the crocodylomorphs underwent major adaptive diversifications to fill ecological niches vacated by recently extinguished groups. Mesozoic crocodylomorphs had a much greater diversity of forms than modern crocodilians; they became small, fast-moving insectivores, specialist fish-eaters, marine and terrestrial carnivores, and herbivores. The earliest stage of crocodilian evolution was the protosuchians in the late Triassic and early Jurassic, which were followed by the mesosuchians that diversified widely during the Jurassic and the Tertiary. The eusuchians first appeared during the Early Cretaceous; this clade includes modern crocodilians.

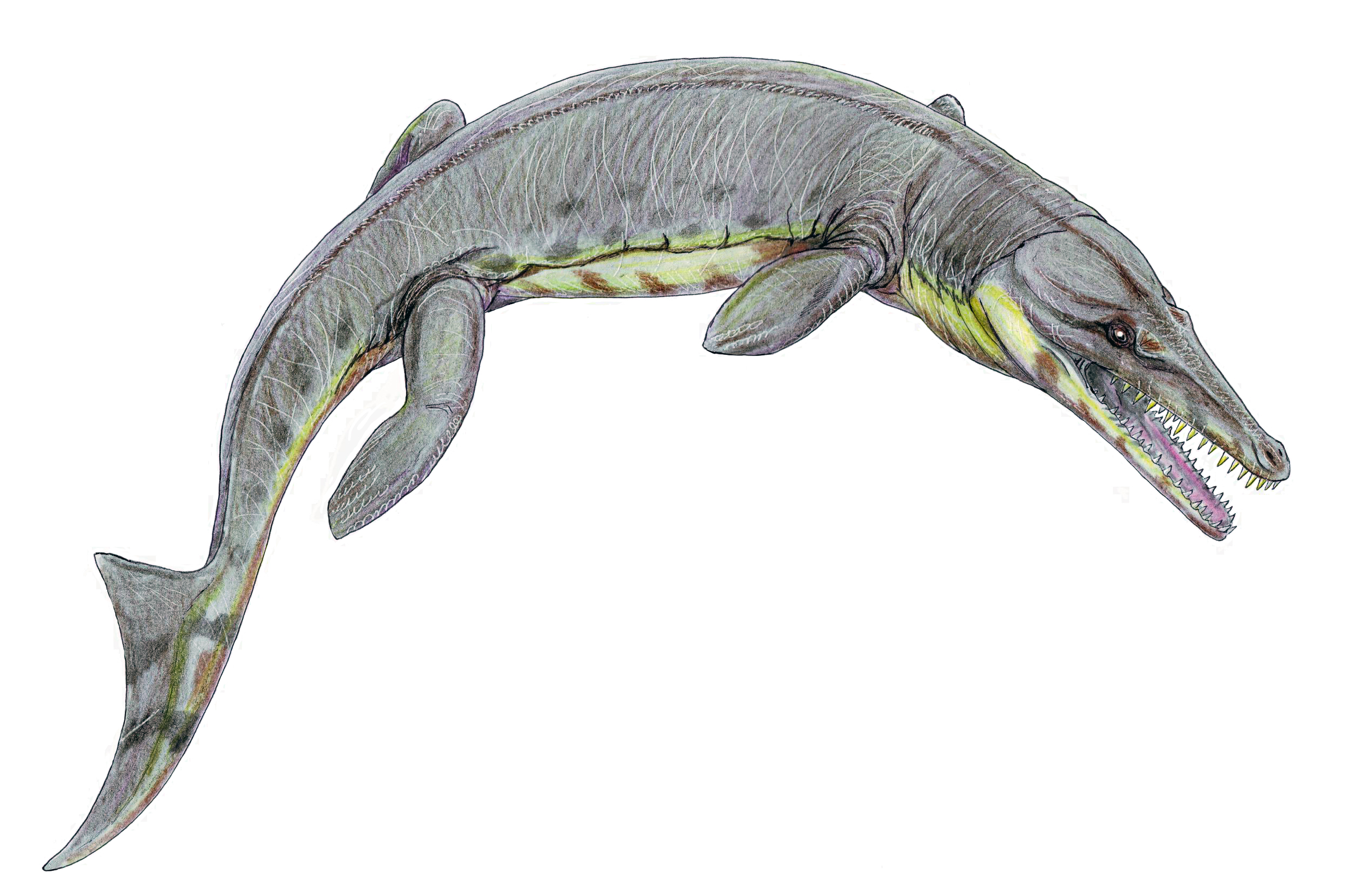
Suchodus, a thalattosuchian highly adapted to a marine lifestyle

Protosuchians were small, mostly terrestrial animals with short snouts and long limbs. They had bony armor in the form of two rows of plates extending from head to tail; this armor would still be found in later species. Their vertebrae were convex on the two main articulating surfaces. The secondary palate was little developed; it consisted only of a maxilla. The mesosuchians underwent a fusion of the palatine bones to the secondary palate, and a great extension of the nasal passages behind the palatine and in front of the pterygoid bones. This adaptation allowed the animal to breathe through its nostrils while its mouth was open underwater. The eusuchians continued this process; the interior nostrils now opened through an aperture in the pterygoid bones. The vertebrae of eusuchians had one convex and one concave articulating surface. The oldest-known eusuchian is Hylaeochampsa vectiana from the Early Cretaceous whose remains occur on the Isle of Wight in the United Kingdom. It was followed by crocodilians such as the Planocraniidae, the hoofed crocodiles, in the Palaeogene. Spanning the Cretaceous and Palaeogene periods is the genus Borealosuchus of North America, with six species, though its phylogenetic position is not settled.

=== Diversification of modern crocodilians ===
The three primary branches of Crocodilia had diverged by the Late Cretaceous. The possible earliest-known members of the group may be Portugalosuchus and Zholsuchus from the Cenomanian-Turonian stages. Some researchers have disputed the classification of Portugalosuchus, claiming it may be outside the crown-group crocodilians. The morphology-based phylogenetic analyses, which are based on new neuroanatomical data obtained from its skull using micro-CT scans, suggest this taxon is a crown-group crocodilian and a member of the 'thoracosaurs' that was recovered as a sister taxon of Thoracosaurus within Gavialoidea, though it is uncertain whether 'thoracosaurs' were true gavialoids.

Definitive alligatoroids first appeared during the Santonian-Campanian stages, while definitive longirostres first appeared during the Maastrichtian stage. The earliest-known alligatoroids and gavialoids include highly derived forms, which indicates the time of the divergence into the three lineages must have been a pre-Campanian event. Additionally, scientists conclude environmental factors played a major role in the evolution of crocodilians and their ancestors; warmer climate is associated with high evolutionary rates and large body sizes.

=== Relationships ===
Crocodylia is cladistically defined as the last common ancestor of Gavialis gangeticus (gharial), Alligator mississippiensis (American alligator), and Crocodylus rhombifer (the Cuban crocodile) and all of its descendants. The phylogenetic relationships between crocodilians has been the subject of debate and conflicting results. Many studies and their resulting cladograms ("family trees") of crocodilians have found the "short-snouted" families of Crocodylidae and Alligatoridae to be close relatives, and the long-snouted Gavialidae is a divergent branch of the tree. The resulting group of short-snouted species, named Brevirostres, was mainly supported by morphological studies that analyzed only skeletal features.

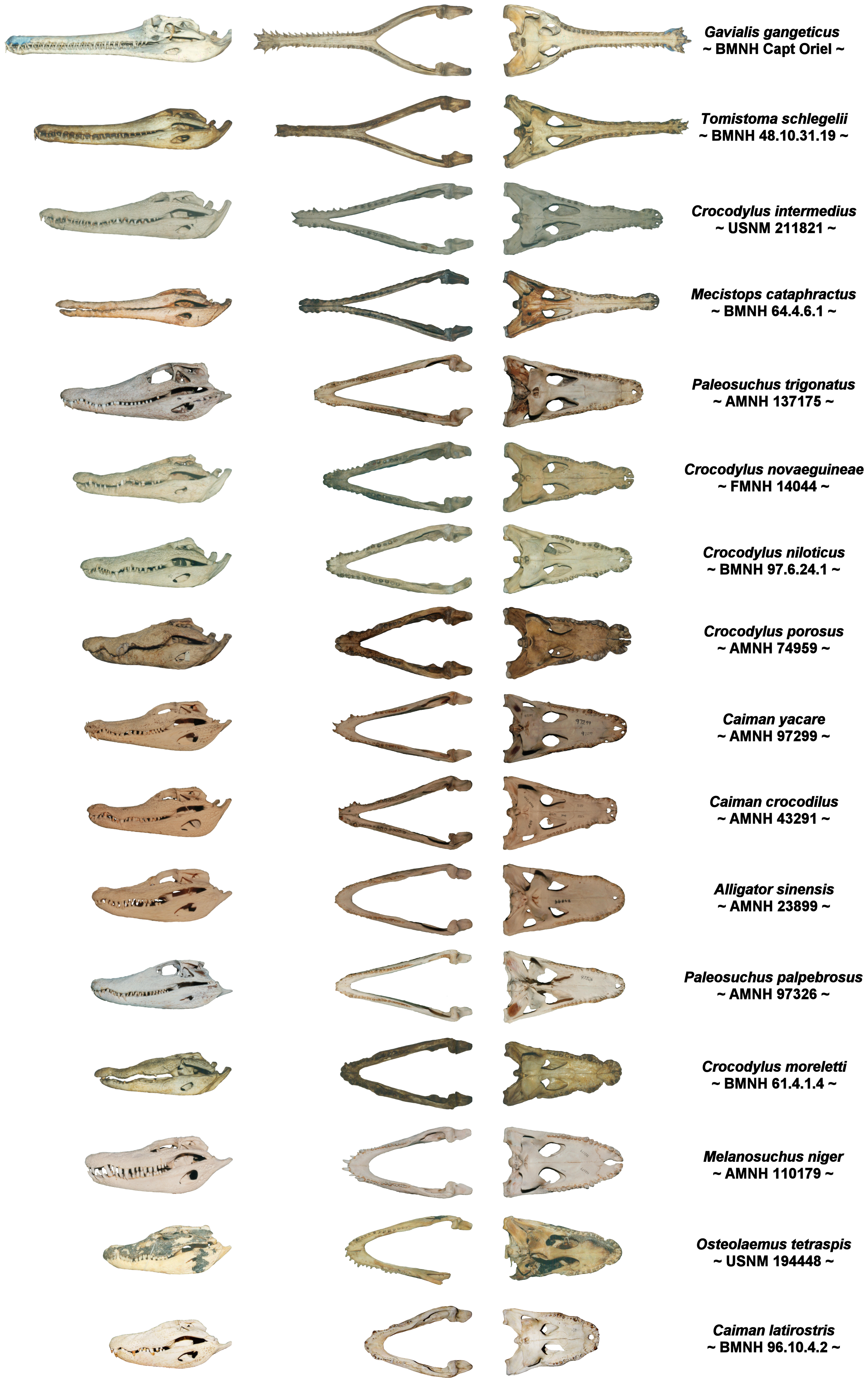
Range of skull shape in extant crocodilians, from narrow to broad-snouted

Recent molecular studies using DNA sequencing of living crocodilians have rejected the distinct group Brevirostres; the long-snouted gavialids are more closely related to crocodiles than to alligators, and the new grouping of gavialids and crocodiles is named Longirostres.

Below is a cladogram from 2021 showing the relationships of the major extant crocodilian groups. This analysis was based on mitochondrial DNA, including that of the recently extinct Voay robustus:

- Crocodilia
  - Alligatoridae
    - Alligatorinae
      Alligator
    - Caimaninae
      - Paleosuchus
      - - Caiman
        - Melanosuchus
  - Longirostres
    - Gavialidae
      - Gavialis
      - Tomistoma
    - Crocodylidae
      - - Crocodylus
        - †Voay
      - - Mecistops
        - Osteolaemus

== Anatomy and physiology ==
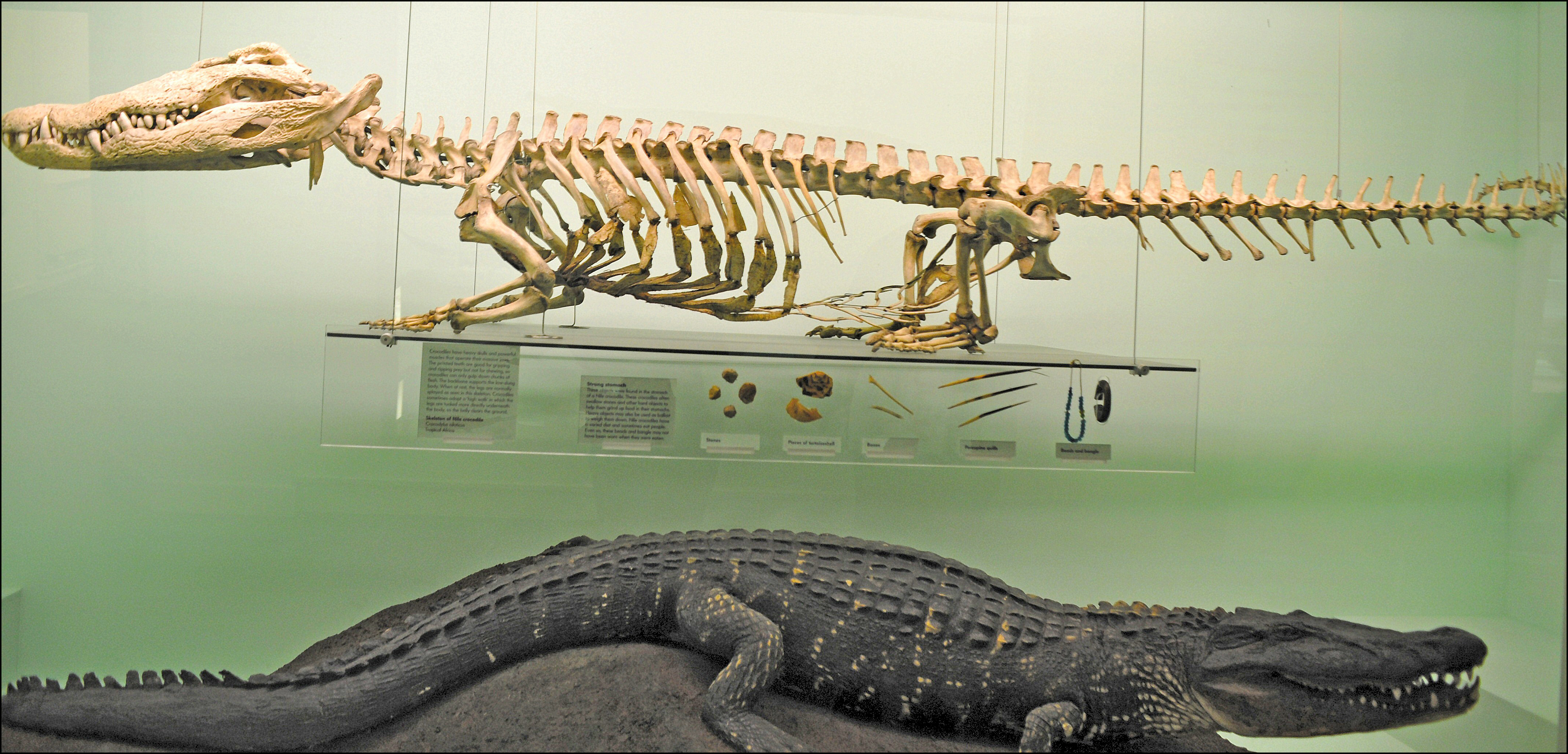
Mounted skeleton of a Nile crocodile and taxidermy of a black caiman

Though there is diversity in snout and tooth shape, all crocodilian species have essentially the same body morphology. They have solidly built, lizard-like bodies with wide, cylindrical torsos, flat heads, long snouts, short necks, and tails that are compressed from side to side. Their limbs are reduced in size; the front feet have five mostly non-webbed digits, and the hind feet have four webbed digits and an extra fifth. The pelvis and ribs of crocodilians are modified; the cartilaginous processes of the ribs allow the thorax to collapse when submerging and the structure of the pelvis can accommodate large amounts of food, or more air in the lungs. Both sexes have a cloaca, a single chamber and outlet near the tail into which the intestinal, urinary and genital tracts open. It houses the penis in males and the clitoris in females. The crocodilian penis is permanently erect; it relies on cloacal muscles to protrude it, and elastic ligaments and a tendon to retract it. The gonads are located near the kidneys.

Crocodilians range in size from the dwarf caimans and African dwarf crocodiles, which reach 1–1.5 m (3 ft 3 in – 4 ft 11 in), to the saltwater crocodile and Nile crocodile, which reach 6 m (20 ft) and weigh up to 1,000 kg (2,200 lb). Some prehistoric species such as the Miocene caiman Purussaurus were even larger, with some estimates putting it over 10 m (33 ft). Crocodilians tend to be sexually dimorphic; males are much larger than females.

=== Locomotion ===
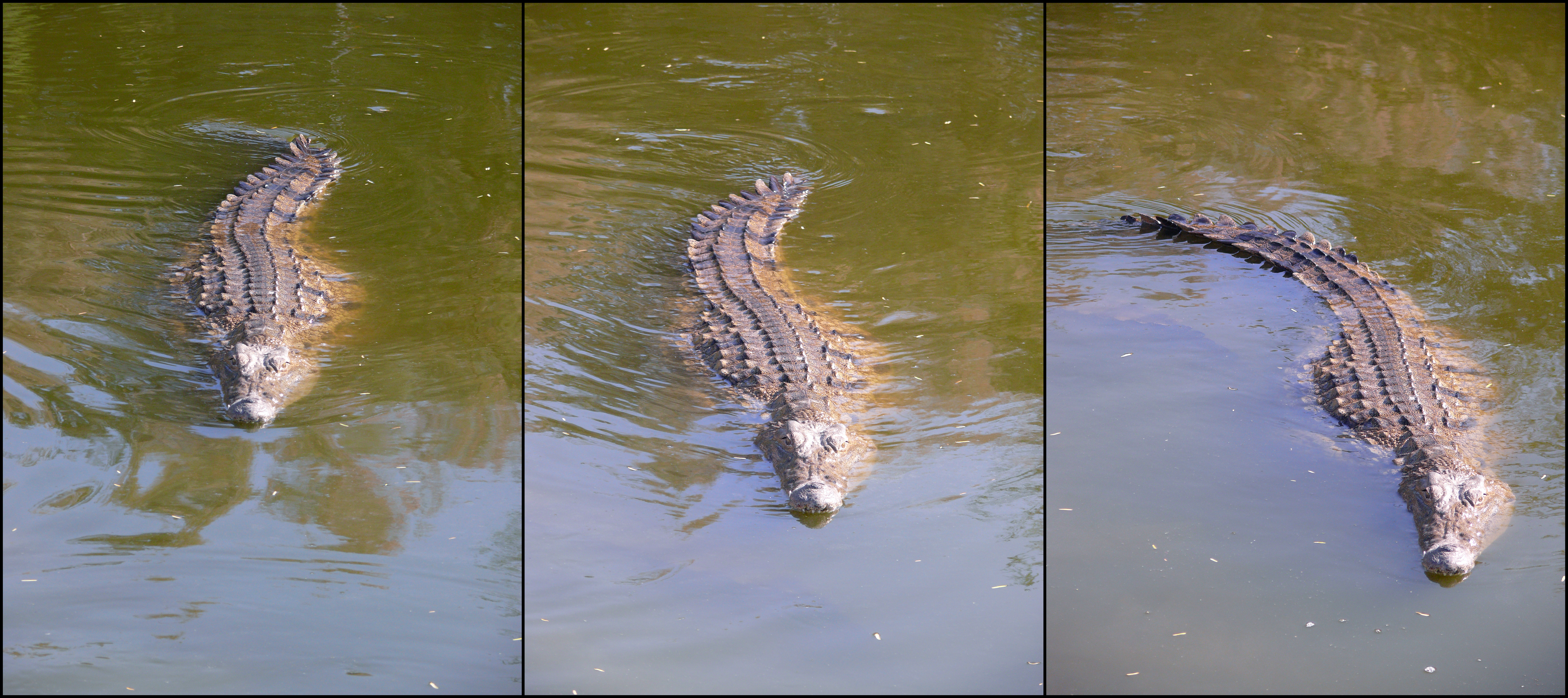
Nile crocodile swimming.

Crocodilians are excellent swimmers. During aquatic locomotion, the muscular tail undulates from side to side to drive the animal through the water while the limbs are held close to the body to reduce drag. When the animal needs to stop or change direction, the limbs are splayed out. Swimming is normally achieved with gentle sinuous movements of the tail, but the animals can move more quickly when pursuing or being pursued. Crocodilians are less well-adapted for moving on land, and are unusual among vertebrates in having two means of terrestrial locomotion: the "high walk" and the "low walk". The ankle joints flex in a different way from those of other reptiles, a feature crocodilians share with some early archosaurs. One of the upper row of ankle bones, the talus bone, moves with the tibia and fibula, while the heel bone moves with the foot and is where the ankle joint is located. The result is the legs can be held almost vertically beneath the body when on land, and the foot swings during locomotion as the ankle rotates.

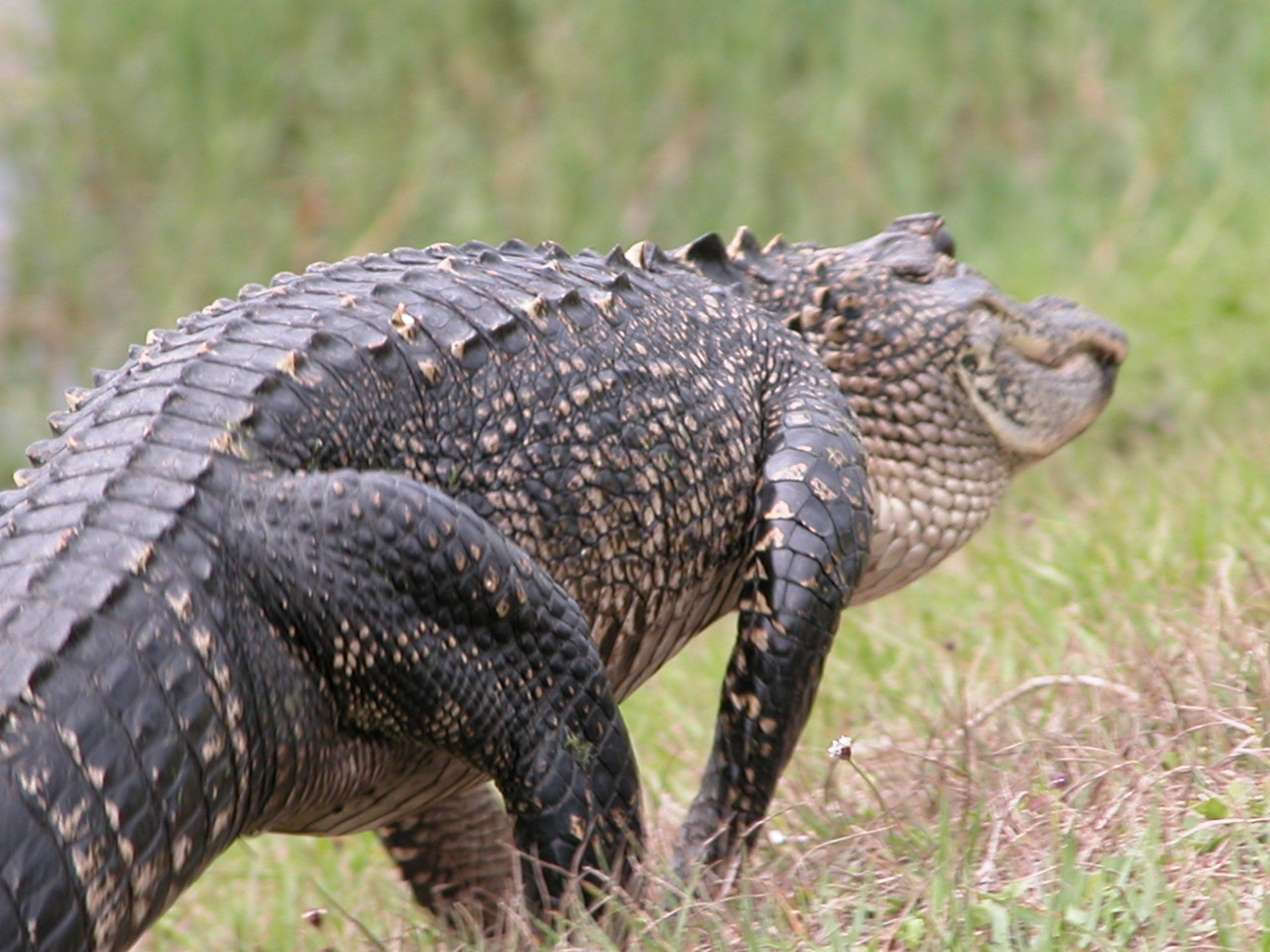
American alligator showing the crocodilian "high walk", with lower limb portions held almost vertically, unlike other reptiles.

The limbs move much the same as those of other quadrupeds; the left forelimb moves first, followed by the right hindlimb, then right forelimb, and finally left hindlimb. The high walk of crocodilians, with the belly and most of the tail held off the ground and the limbs held directly under the bodies, resembles that of mammals and birds. The low walk is similar to the high walk, but the body is not raised, and is quite different from the sprawling walk of salamanders and lizards. Crocodilians can instantly change from one walk to the other; the high walk is the usual means of locomotion on land. The animal may immediately push up its body up use this form, or it may take one or two strides of low walk before raising the body. Unlike most other land vertebrates, when crocodilians increase their pace of travel, they increase the speed at which the lower half of each limb (rather than the whole leg) swings forward, so stride length increases while stride duration decreases.

Though they are typically slow on land, crocodilians can produce brief bursts of speed; some can run at 12 to 14 km/h (7.5 to 8.7 mph) for short distances. In some small species, such as the freshwater crocodile, running can progress to galloping, which involves the hind limbs launching the body forward and the fore limbs subsequently taking the weight. Next, the hind limbs swing forward as the spine flexes dorso-ventrally, and this sequence of movements is repeated. During terrestrial locomotion, a crocodilian can keep its back and tail straight because muscles attach the scales to the vertebrae. Whether on land or in water, crocodilians can jump or leap by pressing their tails and hind limbs against the substrate and launching themselves into the air. A fast entry into water from a muddy bank can be effected by plunging to the ground, twisting the body from side to side and splaying out the limbs.

=== Jaws and teeth ===
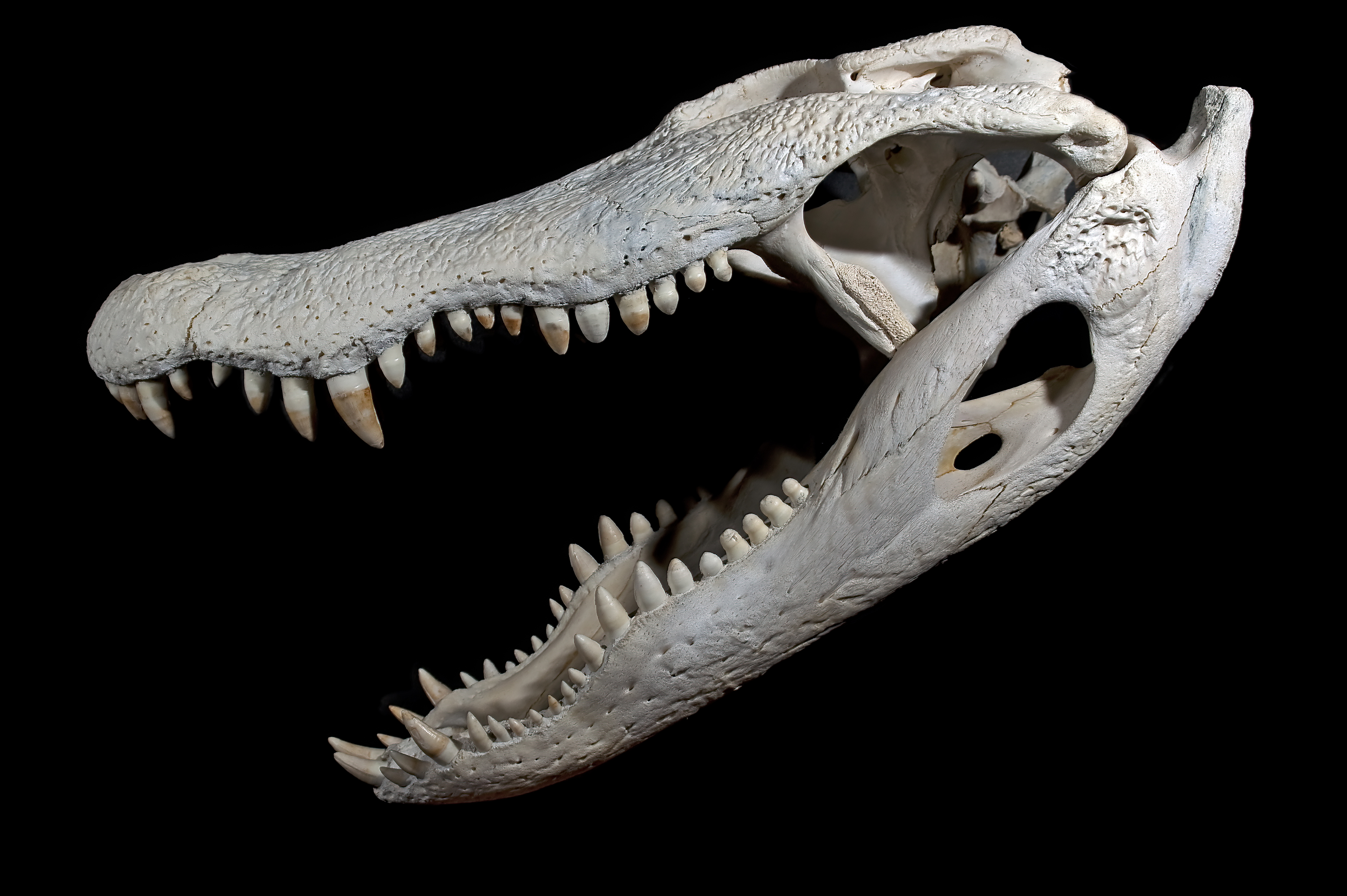
Skull of American alligator

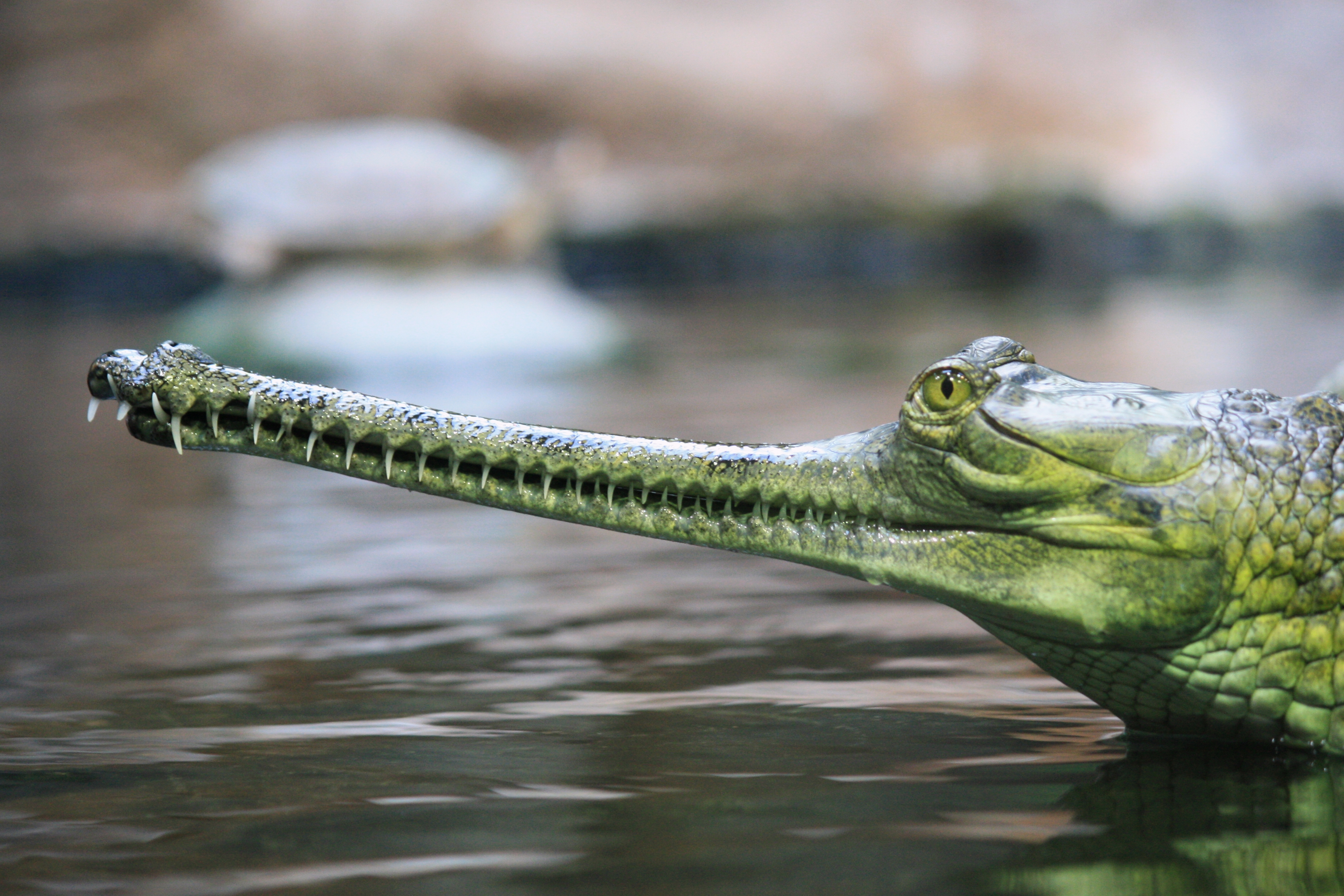
Female gharial head

The snout shape of crocodilians varies between species. Alligators and caimans generally have wide, U-shaped snouts while those of crocodiles are typically narrower and V-shaped. The snouts of the gharials are extremely elongated. The muscles that close the jaws are larger and more powerful than the ones that open them, and a human can quite easily hold shut a crocodilian's jaws, but prying open the jaws is extremely difficult. The powerful closing muscles attach at the middle of the lower jaw. The jaw hinge attaches behind the atlanto-occipital joint, giving the animal a wide gape. A folded membrane holds the tongue stationary.

Crocodilians have some of the strongest bite forces in the animal kingdom. In a study published in 2003, an American alligator's bite force was measured at up to 2,125 lbf (9.45 kN); and in a 2012 study, a saltwater crocodile's bite force was measured at 3,700 lbf (16 kN). This study found no correlation between bite force and snout shape, though the gharial's extremely slender jaws are relatively weak and are built for quick jaw closure.

Crocodilian teeth vary from dull and rounded to sharp and pointed. Broad-snouted species have teeth that vary in size, while those of slender-snouted species are more consistent. In general, in crocodiles and gharials, both rows of teeth are visible when the jaws are closed because their teeth fit into grooves along the outside lining of the upper jaw. By contrast, the lower teeth of alligators and caimans normally fit into holes along the inside lining of the upper jaw, so they are hidden when the jaws are closed. Crocodilians are homodonts, meaning each of their teeth are of the same type; they do not have different tooth types, such as canines and molars. Crocodilians are polyphyodonts; they are able to replace each of their approximately 80 teeth up to 50 times in their 35-to-75-year lifespan. Crocodilians are the only non-mammalian vertebrates with tooth sockets. Next to each full-grown tooth is a small replacement tooth and an odontogenic stem cell in the dental lamina that can be activated when required. Tooth replacement slows and eventually stops as the animal ages.

=== Sense organs ===
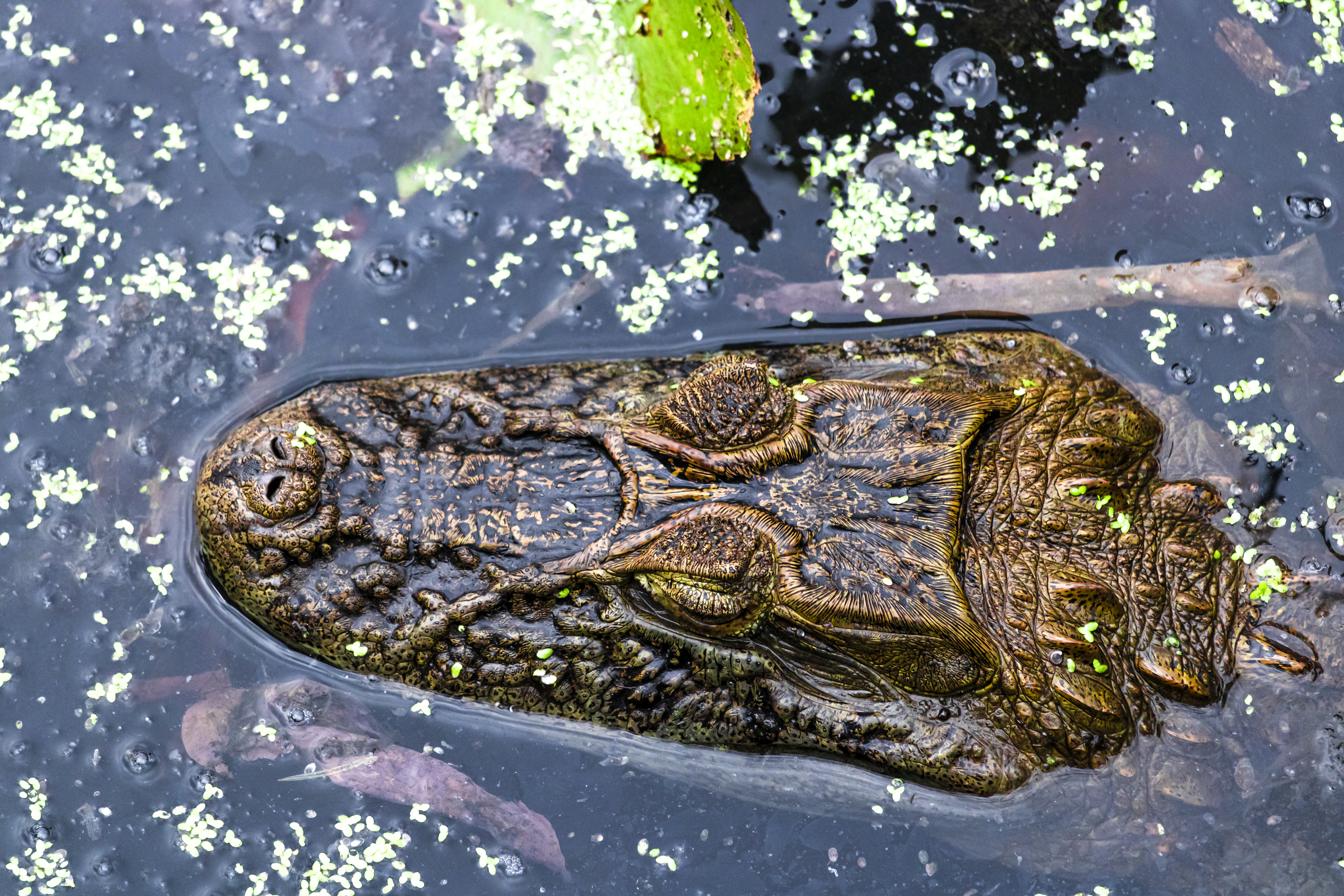
Overhead view of broad-snouted caiman with eyes, ears and nostrils above water

The eyes, ears and nostrils of crocodilians are at the top of the head; this placement allows them to stalk their prey with most of their bodies underwater. When in bright light, the pupils of a crocodilian contract into narrow slits, whereas in darkness they become large circles, as is typical for animals that hunt at night. Crocodilians' eyes have a tapetum lucidum that enhances vision in low light. When the animal completely submerges, the nictitating membranes cover its eyes. Glands on the nictitating membrane secrete a salty lubricant that keeps the eye clean. When a crocodilian leaves the water and dries off, this substance is visible as "tears". While eyesight in air is fairly good, it is significantly weakened underwater. Crocodilians appear to have undergone a "nocturnal bottleneck" early in their history, during which their eyes lost traits like scleral rings, an annular pad of the lens and coloured cone oil droplets, giving them dichromatic vision (red-green colourblindness). Since then, some crocodilians appear to have re-evolved full-colour vision.

The ears are adapted for hearing both in air and underwater, and the eardrums are protected by flaps that can be opened or closed by muscles. Crocodilians have a wide hearing range, with sensitivity comparable to most birds and many mammals. Hearing in crocodilians does not degrade as the animal ages because they can regrow and replace hair cells. The well-developed trigeminal nerve allows them to detect vibrations in water, such as those made by potential prey. Crocodilians have a single olfactory chamber and the vomeronasal organ disappears when they reach adulthood. Behavioural and olfactometer experiments indicate crocodiles detect both air-borne and water-soluble chemicals, and use their olfactory system for hunting. When above water, crocodiles enhance their ability to detect volatile odorants by gular pumping, a rhythmic movement of the floor of the pharynx. Crocodiles appear to have lost their pineal organ but still show signs of melatonin rhythms.

=== Skin and scales ===
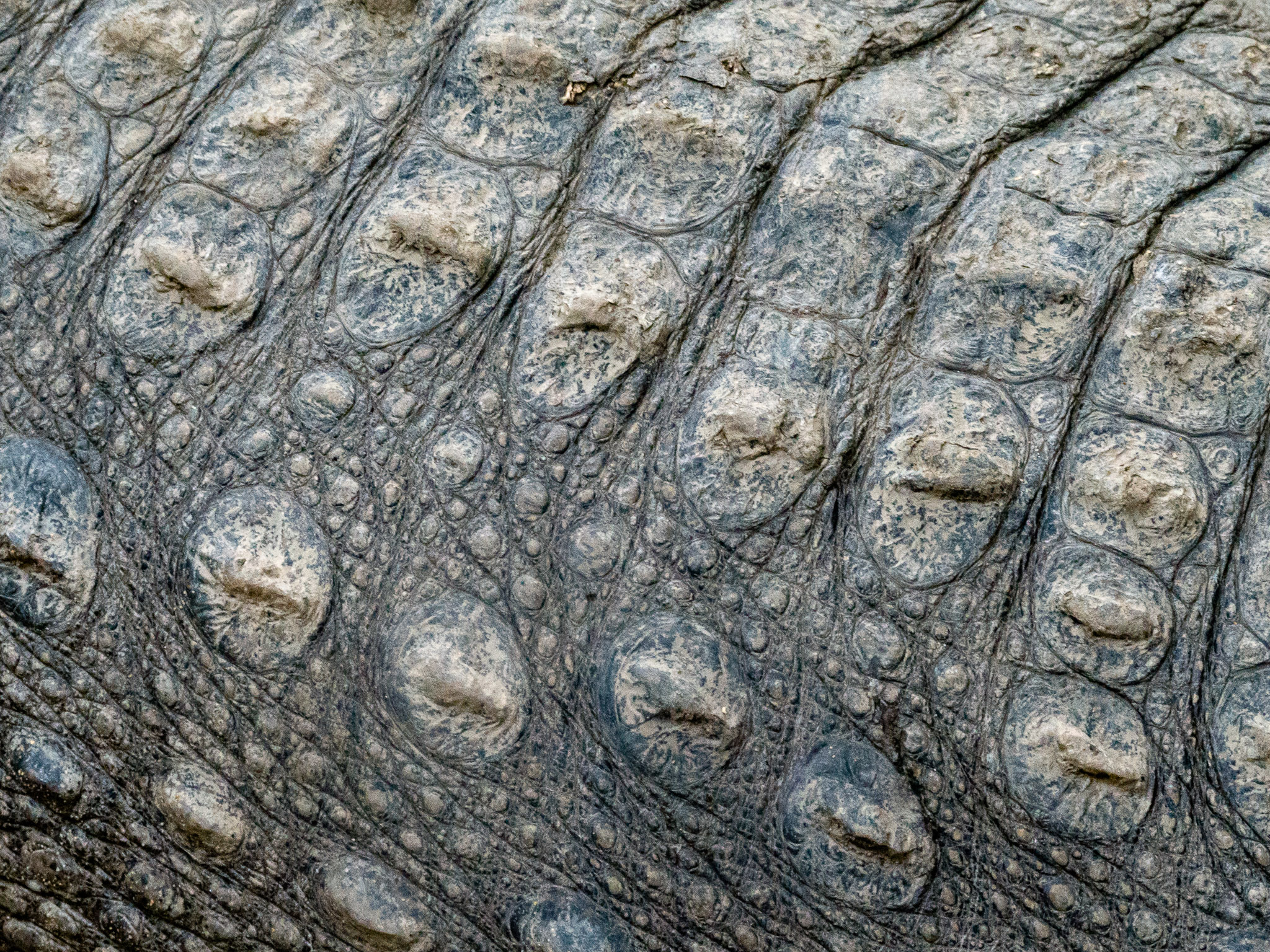
Skin of a mugger crocodile

The skin of crocodilians is clad in non-overlapping scales known as scutes that are covered by beta-keratin. Many of the scutes are strengthened by bony plates known as osteoderms. Scutes are most numerous on the back and neck of the animal. The belly and underside of the tail have rows of broad, flat, square-shaped scales. Between crocodilian scales are hinge areas that consist mainly of alpha-keratin. Underneath the surface, the dermis is thick with collagen. Both the head and jaws lack scales and are instead covered in tight, keratinised skin that is fused directly to the bones of the skull and which, over time, develop a pattern of cracks as the skull develops. The skin on the neck and sides is loose. The scutes contain blood vessels and may act to absorb or release heat during thermoregulation. Research also suggests alkaline ions released into the blood from the calcium and magnesium in the dermal bones act as a buffer during prolonged submersion when increasing levels of carbon dioxide would otherwise cause acidosis.

Some scutes contain a single pore known as an integumentary sense organ. Crocodiles and gharials have these on large parts of their bodies, while alligators and caimans only have them on the head. Their exact function is not fully understood, but it has been suggested they may be mechanosensory organs. There are prominent, paired integumentary glands in skin folds on the throat, and others in the side walls of the cloaca. Various functions for these have been suggested; they may play a part in communication—indirect evidence suggests they secrete pheromones used in courtship or nesting. The skin of crocodilians is tough and can withstand damage from conspecifics, and the immune system is effective enough to heal wounds within a few days. In the genus Crocodylus, the skin contains chromatophores, allowing animals to change colour from dark to light and vice versa.

Skulls and osteoderms
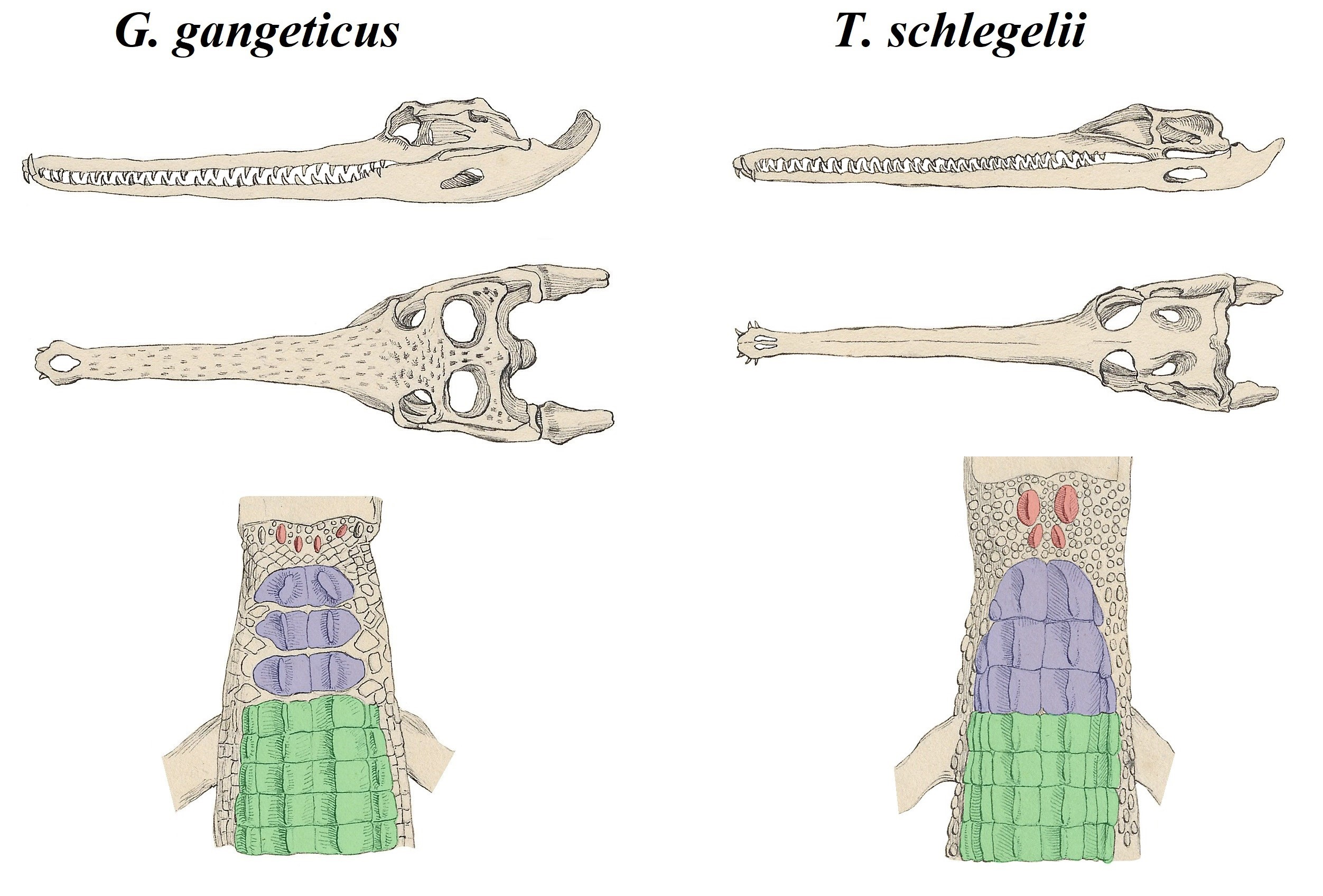
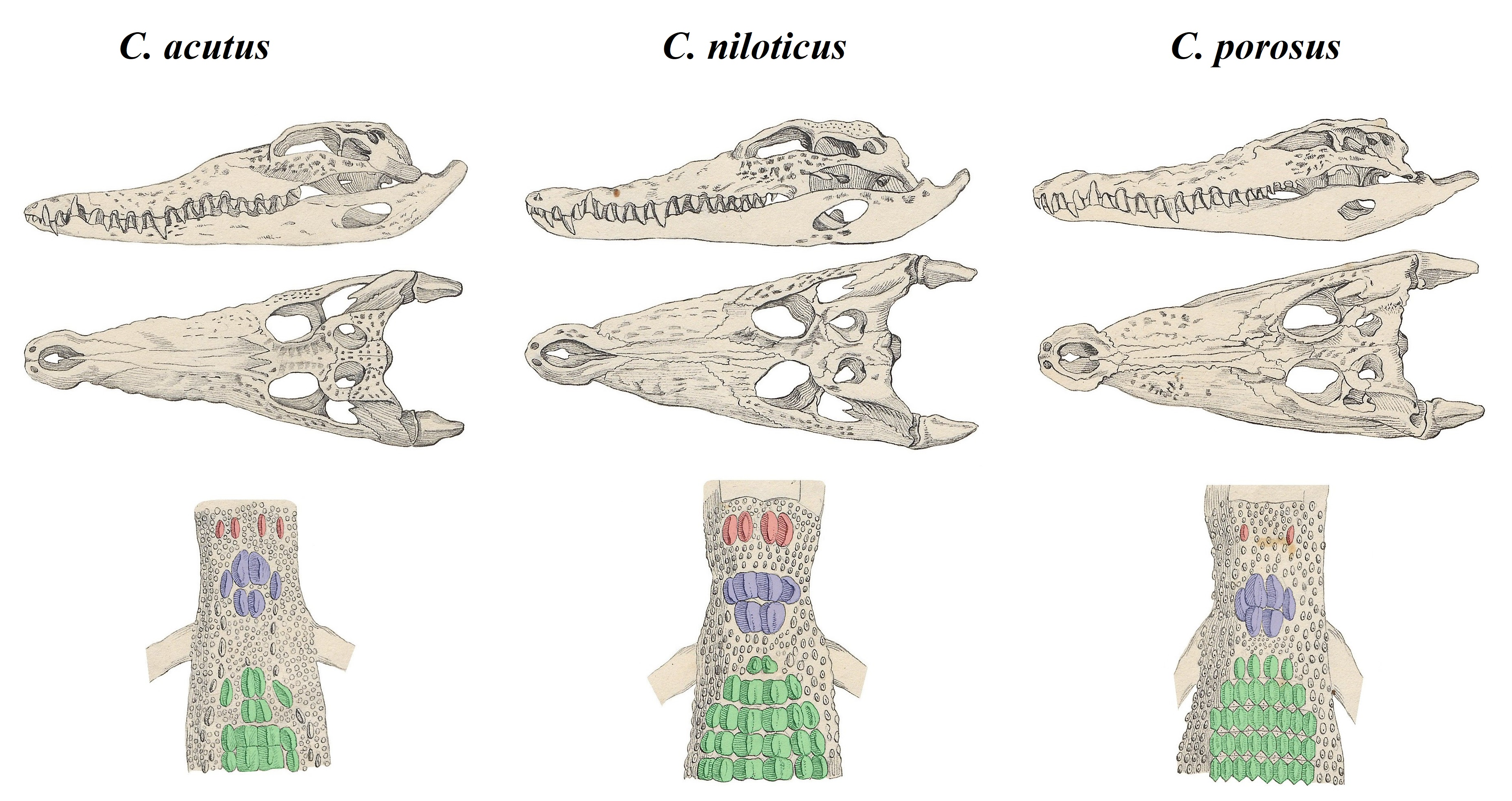
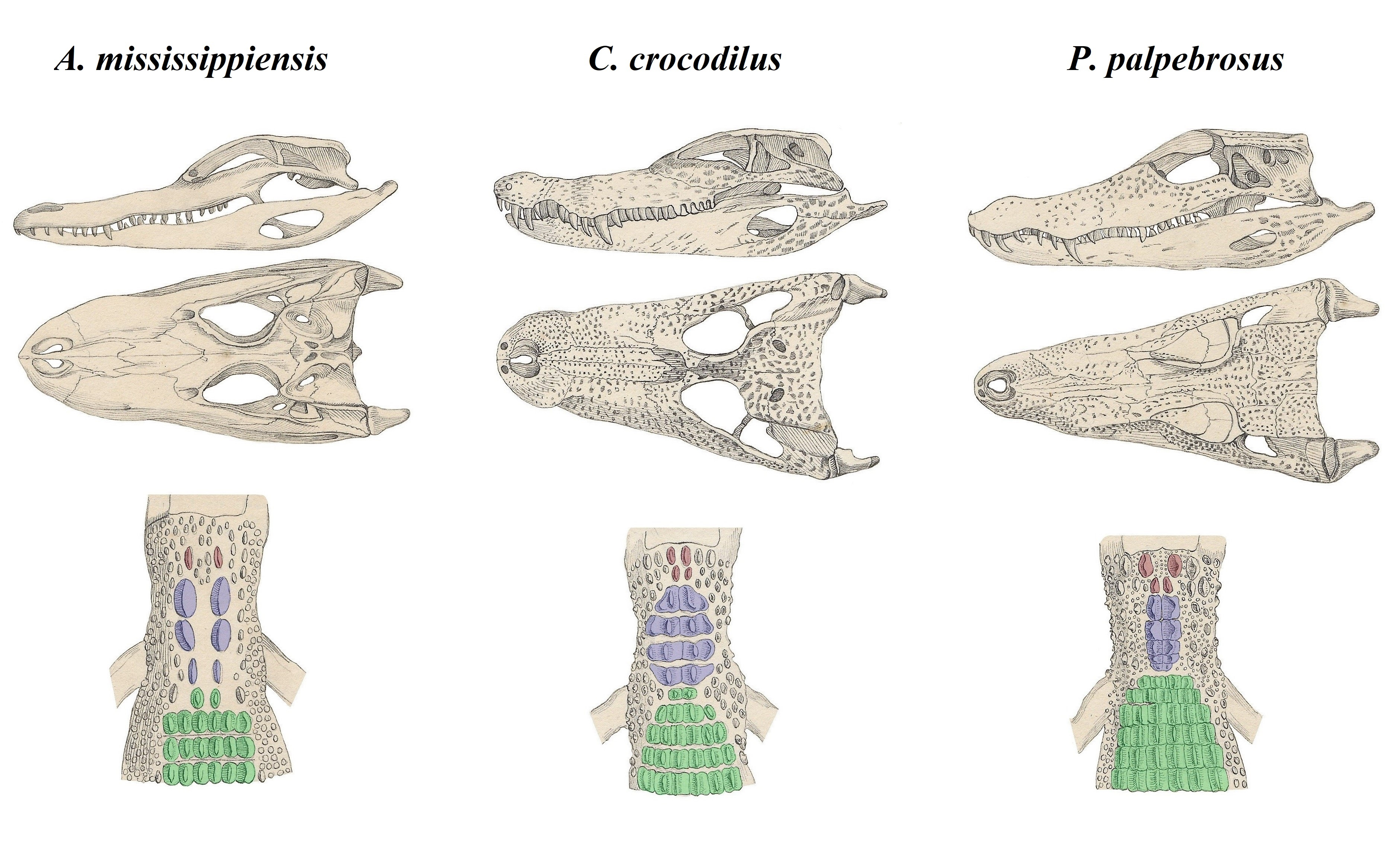
Left to right: gharial, false gharial, American crocodile, Nile crocodile, saltwater crocodile, American alligator, spectacled caiman, and Cuvier's dwarf caiman

=== Circulation ===
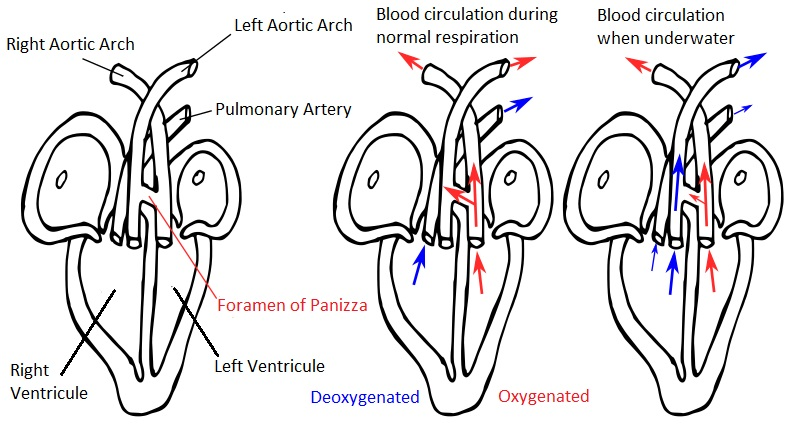
Diagram of crocodilian heart and circulation

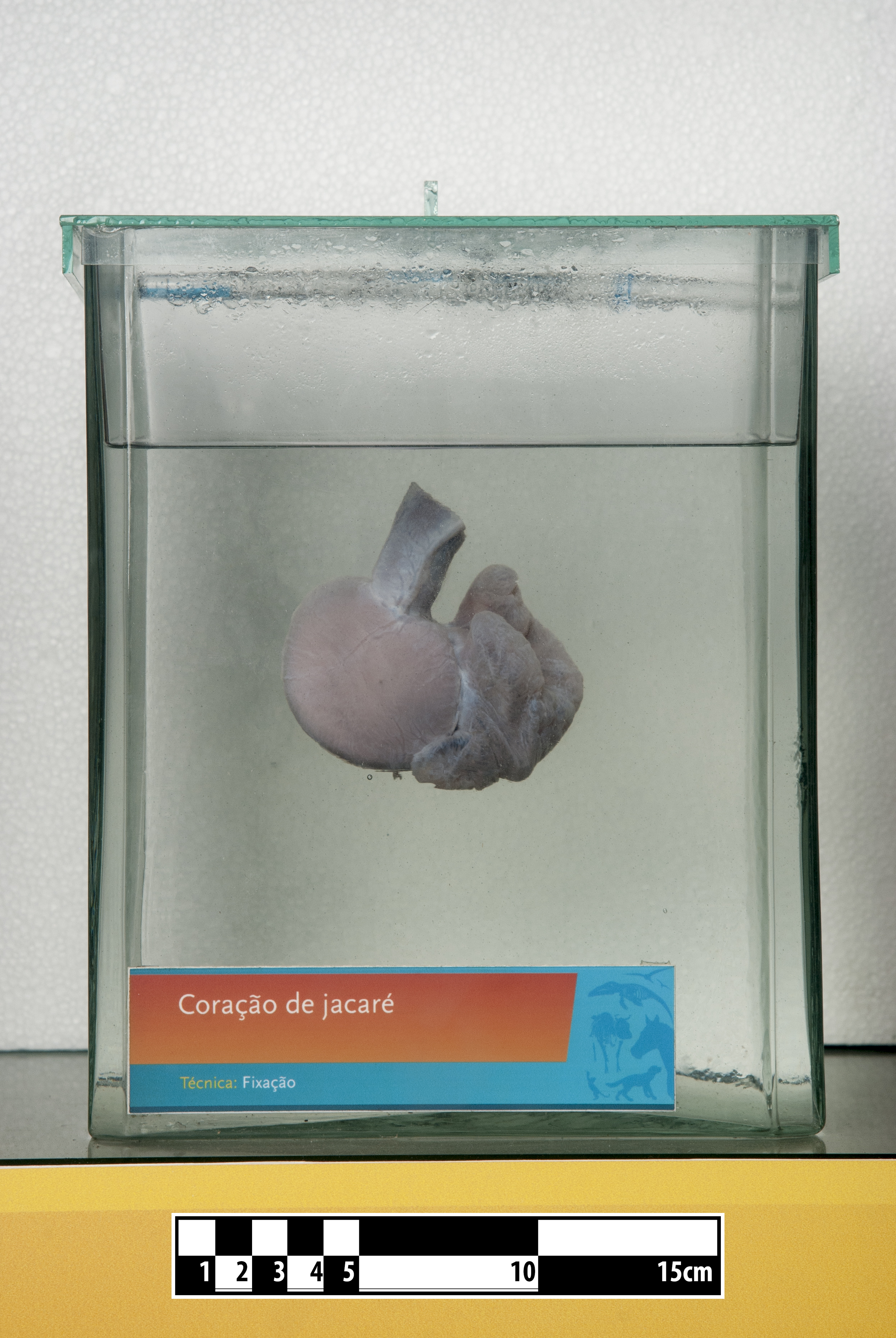
Yacare caiman heart, in formalin

Crocodilians may have the most-complex vertebrate circulatory system with a four-chambered heart and two ventricles, an unusual trait among extant reptiles. Both have left and right aorta are connected by a hole called the Foramen of Panizza. Like birds and mammals, crocodilians have vessels that separately direct blood flow to the lungs and the rest of the body. They also have unique, cog-teeth-like valves that when interlocked direct blood to the left aorta and away from the lungs, and then around the body. This system may allow the animals to remain submerged for a lengthy period, but this explanation has been questioned. Other possible reasons for the peculiar circulatory system include assistance with thermoregulatory needs, prevention of pulmonary oedema, and quick recovery from metabolic acidosis. Retention of carbon dioxide within the body permits an increase in the rate of gastric acid secretion and thus the efficiency of digestion, and other gastrointestinal organs such as the pancreas, spleen, small intestine, and liver also function more efficiently.

When submerged, a crocodilian's heart may beat at only once or twice a minute, with little blood flow to the muscle. When it rises and takes a breath, its heart rate almost immediately increases and the muscles receive newly oxygenated blood. Unlike many marine mammals, crocodilians have little myoglobin to store oxygen in their muscles. While diving, an increasing concentration of bicarbonate ions causes haemoglobin in the blood to release oxygen for the muscles.

=== Respiration ===
X-ray fluoroscopy videos of a female American alligator showing contraction of the lungs while breathing (dorsoventral view above and lateral view below)

Crocodilians were traditionally thought to breathe like mammals, with airflow tidally moving in and out, but studies published in 2010 and 2013 conclude respiration in crocodilians is more bird-like, with airflow moving in a unidirectional loop within the lungs. During inhalation, air flows through the trachea and into two primary bronchi (airways) that divide into narrower secondary passageways. The air continues to move through these, then into even narrower tertiary airways, and then into other secondary airways that were bypassed the first time. The air then flows back into the primary airways and is exhaled.

In crocodilians, the diaphragmaticus muscle, which is analogous to the diaphragm in mammals, attaches the lungs to the liver and pelvis. During inhalation, the external intercostal muscles expand the ribs, allowing the animal to take in more air, while the ischiopubis muscle causes the hips to swing downwards and push the belly outward, while the diaphragmaticus pulls the liver back. When exhaling, the internal intercostal muscles push the ribs inwards while the rectus abdominis pulls the hips and liver forwards and the belly inward. Crocodilians can also use these muscles to adjust the position of their lungs, controlling their buoyancy in the water. An animal sinks when the lungs are pulled towards the tail and floats when they move back towards the head. This allows them to move through the water without creating disturbances that could alert potential prey. They can also spin and twist by moving their lungs laterally.

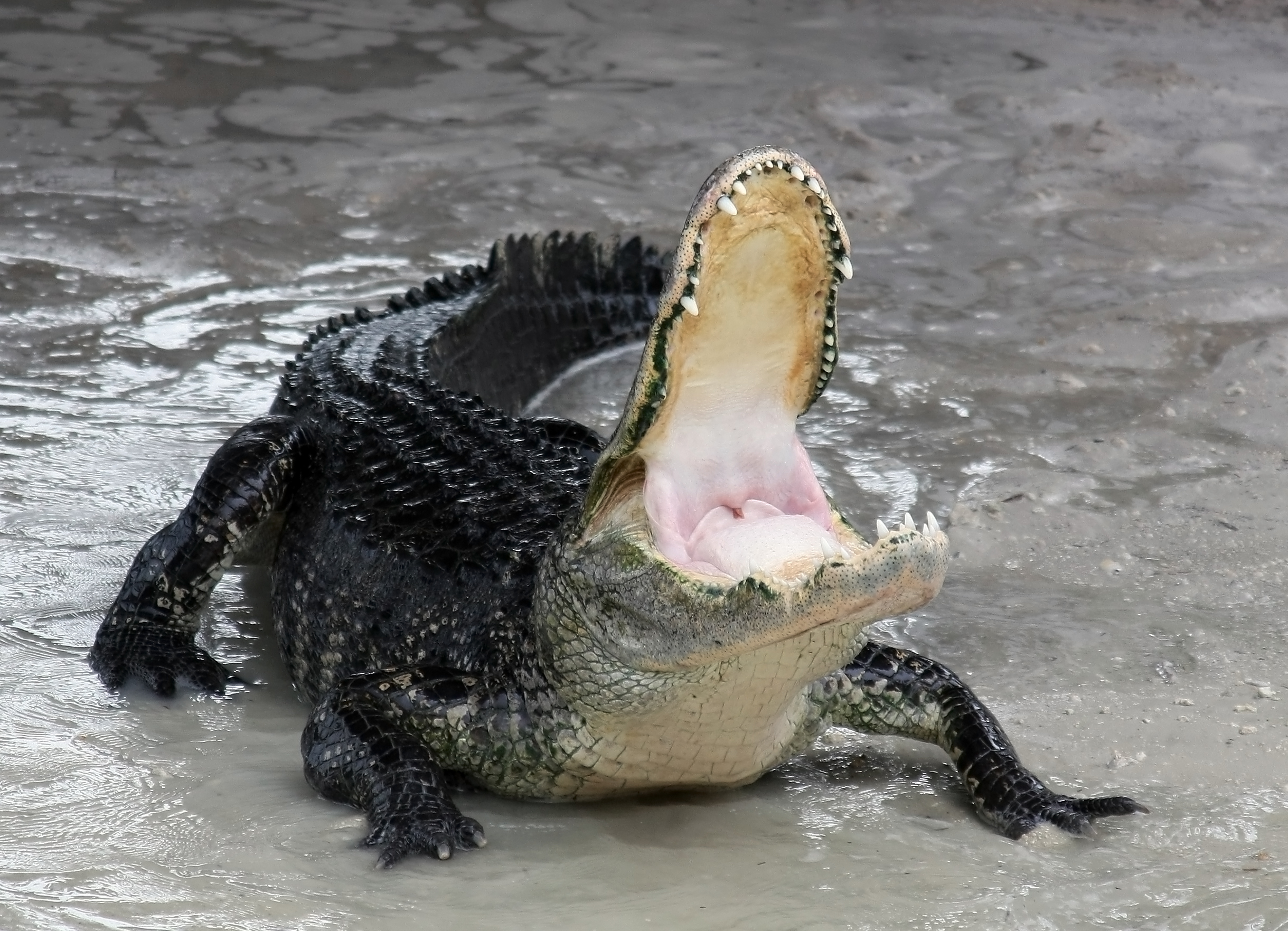
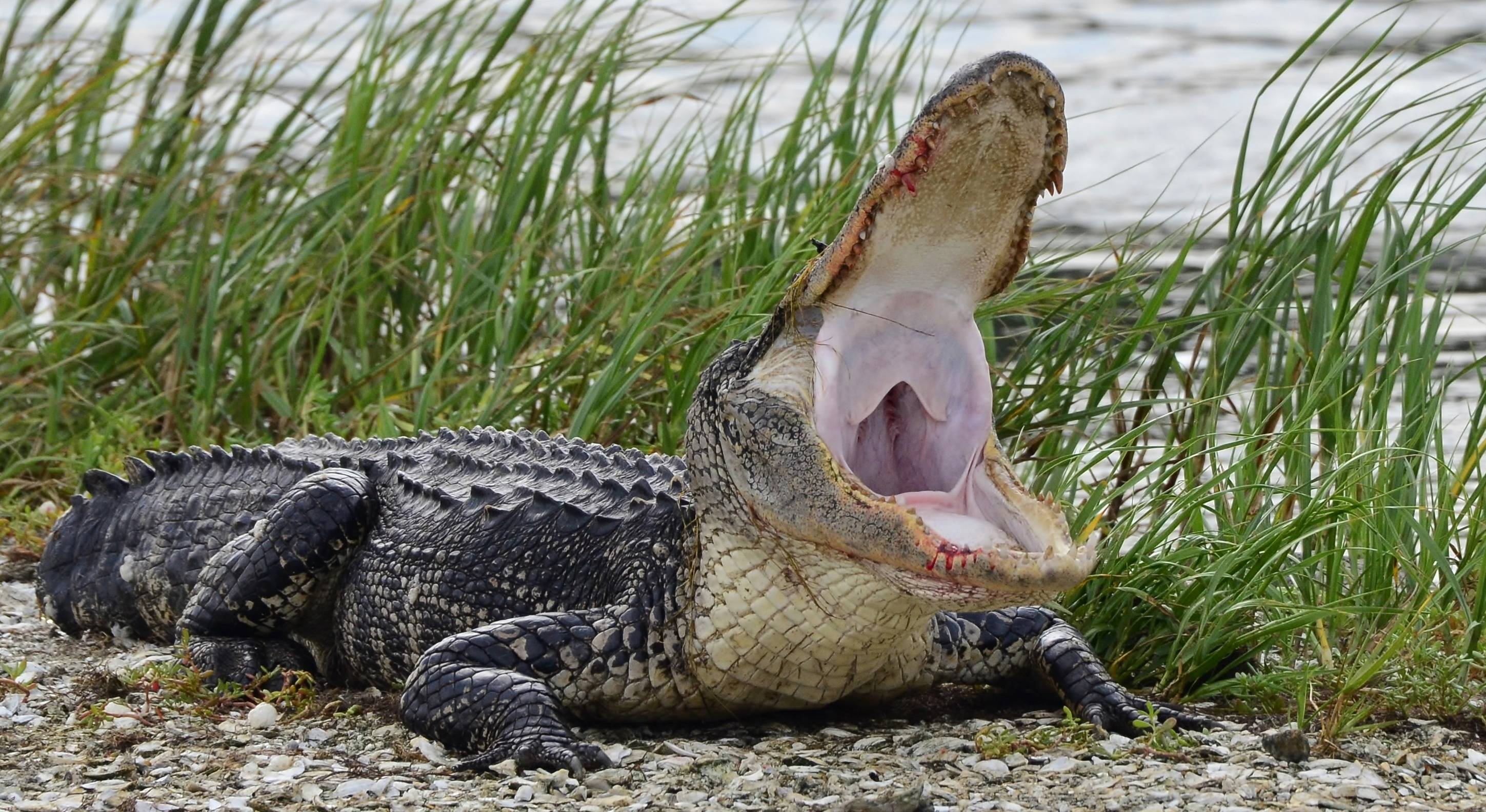
American alligators showing closed (top) and open (bottom) palatal valves

When swimming and diving, crocodilians appear to rely on lung volume for buoyancy more than for oxygen storage. Just before diving, the animal exhales to reduce its lung volume and reach negative buoyancy. When diving, the nostrils of a crocodilian shut tight. All species have a palatal valve, a membranous flap of skin at the back of the oral cavity (mouth) that protects the oesophagus and trachea when the animal is underwater. This enables them to open their mouths underwater without drowning. Crocodilians typically remain underwater for up to fifteen minutes, but under ideal conditions, some can hold their breath for up to two hours. The depth to which crocodilians can dive is unknown, but crocodiles can dive to at least 20 m (66 ft).

Crocodilians vocalize by vibrating vocal folds in the larynx. The folds of the American alligator have a complex morphology consisting of epithelium, lamina propria and muscle, and according to Riede et al. (2015): "it is reasonable to expect species-specific morphologies in vocal folds/analogues as far back as basal reptiles". Although crocodilian vocal folds lack the elasticity of mammalian ones, the larynx is still capable of complex motor control similar to that in birds and mammals, and can adequately control its fundamental frequency.

=== Digestion ===
Crocodilian teeth can only hold onto prey, and food is swallowed unchewed. The stomach consists of a grinding gizzard and a digestive chamber. Indigestible items are regurgitated as pellets. The stomach is more acidic than that of any other vertebrate and contains ridges for gastroliths, which play a role in the crushing of food. Digestion takes place more quickly at higher temperatures. When digesting a meal, CO^{2}-rich blood near the lungs is redirected to the stomach, supplying more acid for the oxyntic glands. Compared to crocodiles, alligators digest more carbohydrates relative to protein. Crocodilians have a very low metabolic rate and thus low energy requirements. They can withstand extended fasting by living on stored fat. Even recently hatched crocodiles are able to survive 58 days without food, losing 23% of their bodyweight during this time.

=== Thermoregulation ===
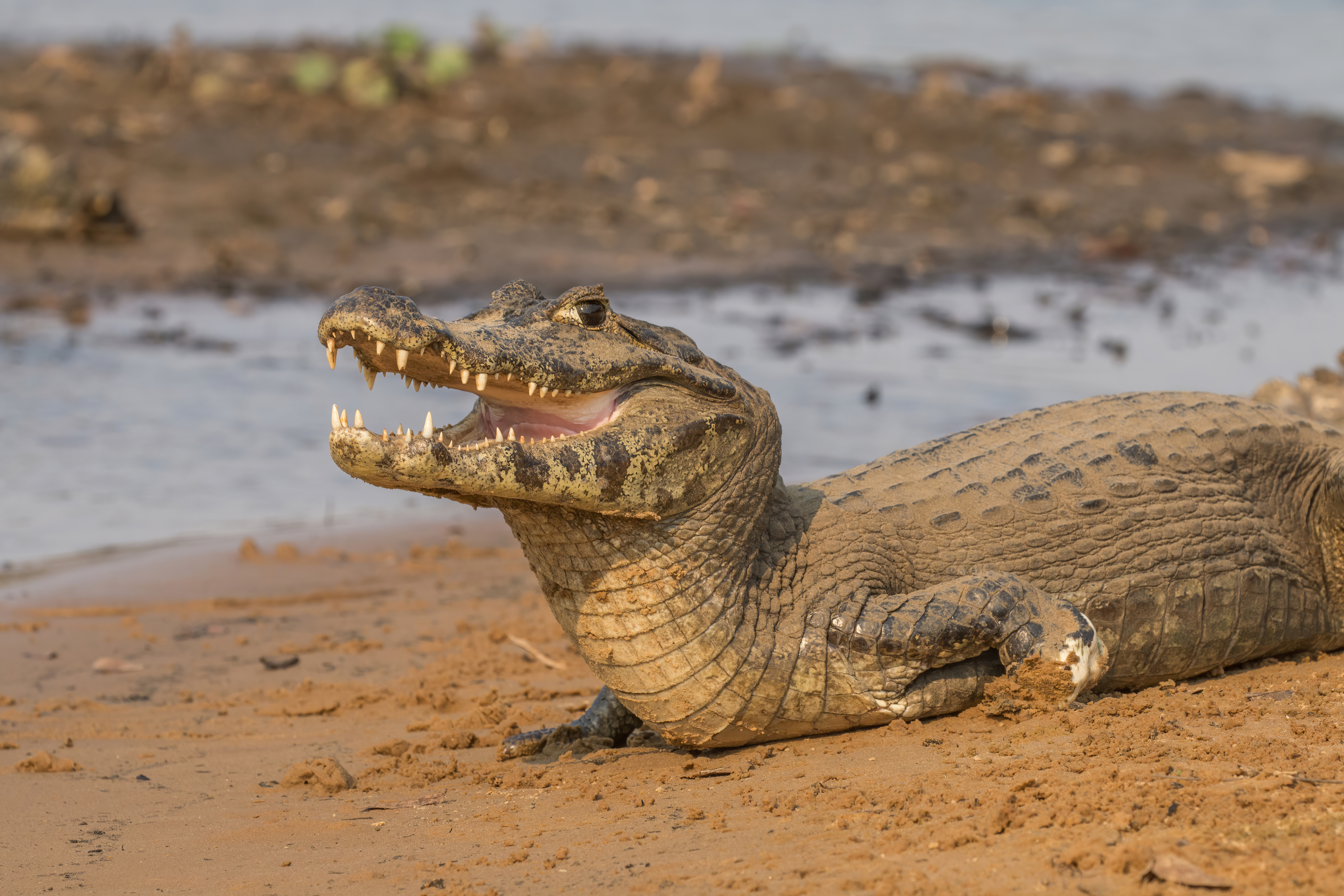
Yacare caiman basking and gaping

Crocodilians are ectotherms ('cold-blooded'), relying mostly on their environment to control their body temperature. The main means of warming is sun's heat, while immersion in water may either raise its temperature via thermal conduction or cool the animal in hot weather. The main method for regulating its temperature is behavioural; temperate-living alligators may start the day by basking in the sun on land and move into water for the afternoon, with parts of the back breaking the surface so it can still be warmed by the sun. At night, it remains submerged and its temperature slowly falls. The basking period is longer in winter. Tropical crocodiles bask briefly in the morning and move into water for rest of the day. They may return to land at nightfall when the air cools. Animals also cool themselves by gaping the mouth, which cools by evaporation from the mouth lining. By these means, the temperature range of crocodilians is usually maintained between 25 and 35 °C (77 and 95 °F), and mainly stays in the range 30 to 33 °C (86 to 91 °F).

Both the American and Chinese alligator can be found in areas that sometimes experience periods of frost in winter. In cold weather, alligators remain submerged with their tails in deeper, less-cold water and their nostrils projecting just above the surface. If ice forms on the water, they maintain ice-free breathing holes, and there have been occasions when their snouts have become frozen into ice. Temperature-sensing probes implanted in wild American alligators have found their core body temperatures can fall to around 5 °C (41 °F), but as long as they remain able to breathe, they show no ill effects when the weather warms.

=== Osmoregulation ===
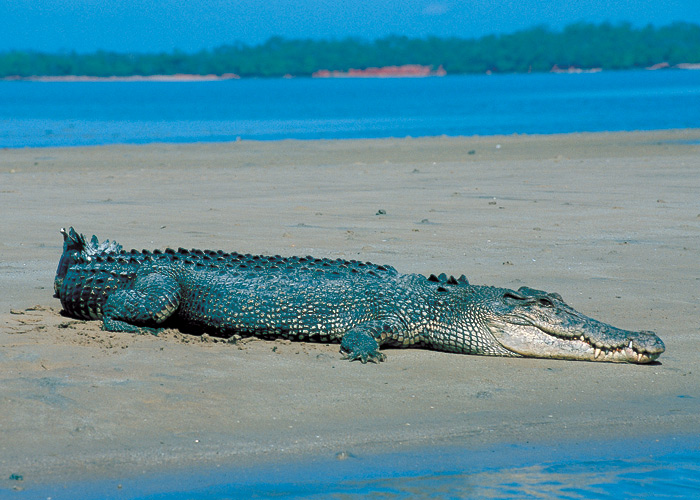
Saltwater crocodile resting on beach

All crocodilians need to maintain a suitable concentration of salt in body fluids. Osmoregulation is related to the quantity of salts and water that are exchanged with the environment. Intake of water and salts occurs across the lining of the mouth, when water is drunk, incidentally while feeding, and when present in foods. Water is lost during breathing, and salts and water are lost in the urine and faeces, through the skin, and in crocodiles and gharials via salt-excreting glands on the tongue. The skin is a largely effective barrier for water and ions. Gaping causes water loss by evaporation. Large animals are better able than small ones to maintain homeostasis at times of osmotic stress. Newly hatched crocodilians are much less tolerant of exposure to salt water than are older juveniles, presumably because they have a higher surface-area-to-volume ratio.

The kidneys and excretory system are much the same as those in other reptiles, but crocodilians do not have a bladder. In fresh water, the osmolality (the concentration of solutes that contribute to a solution's osmotic pressure) in the plasma is much higher than that of the surrounding water. The animals are well-hydrated, the urine in the cloaca is abundant and dilute, and nitrogen is excreted as ammonium bicarbonate. Sodium loss is low and mainly occurs through the skin in freshwater conditions. In seawater, the opposite is true; the osmolality in the plasma is lower than that of the surrounding water, causing the animal to dehydrate. The cloacal urine is much more concentrated, white, and opaque, and nitrogenous waste is mostly excreted as insoluble uric acid.

== Distribution and habitat ==
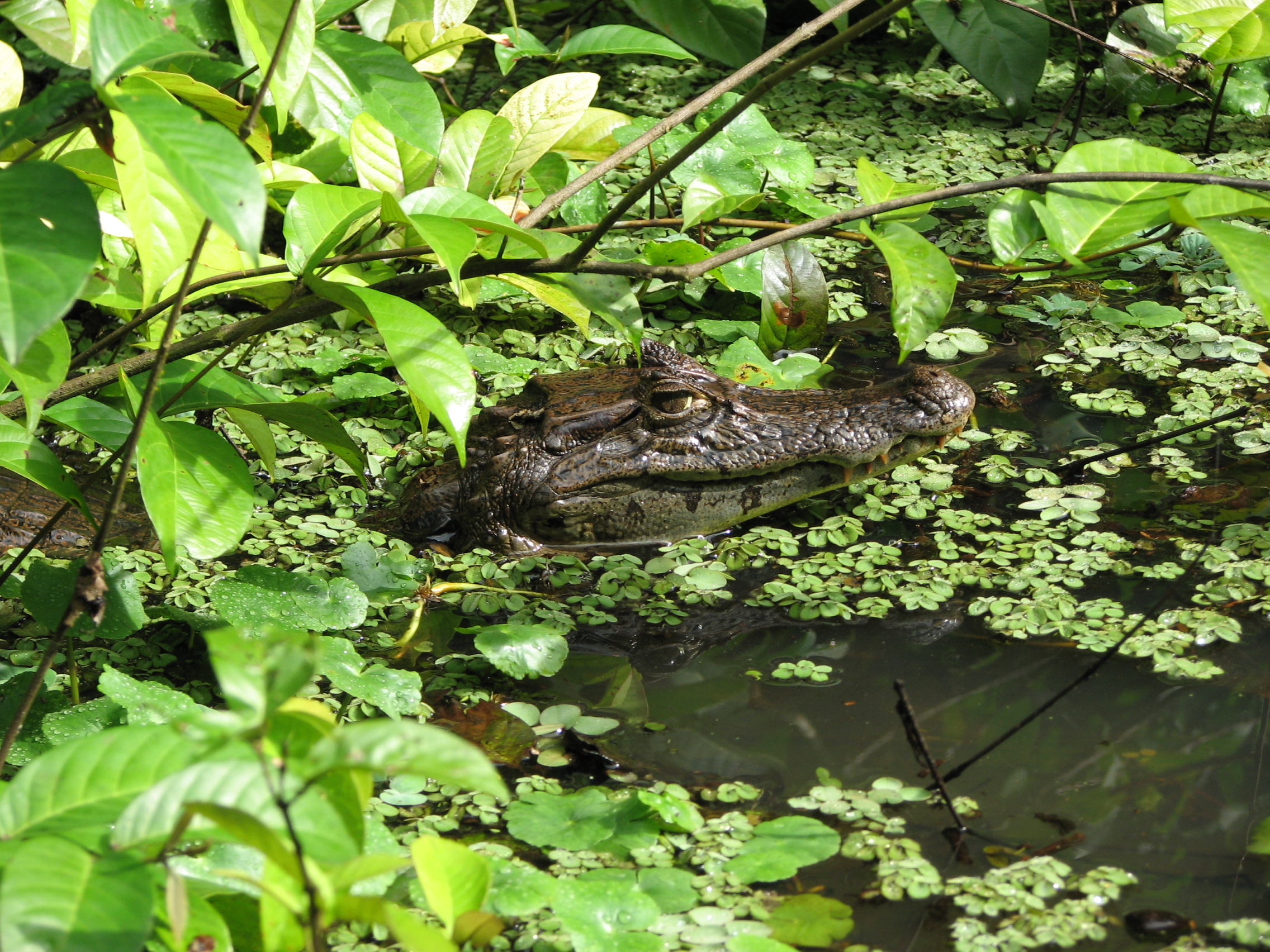
Spectacled caiman immersed in vegetation covered water

Crocodilians are amphibious, living both in water and on land. The last-surviving, fully terrestrial genus Mekosuchus became extinct about 3,000 years ago after humans had arrived on the Pacific islands it inhabited, making the extinction possibly anthropogenic. Crocodilians are typically creatures of the tropics; the main exceptions are the American and Chinese alligators, whose ranges are the southeastern United States and the Yangtze River, respectively. Florida, United States, is the only place where the ranges of crocodiles and alligators coincide. Crocodilians live almost exclusively in lowland habitiat, and do not appear to live above 1,000 metres (3,300 ft). With a range extending from eastern India to New Guinea and northern Australia, the saltwater crocodile is the widest-spread species.

Crocodilians use various types of aquatic habitats. Due to their diet, gharials are found in pools and backwaters of rapidly flowing rivers. Caimans prefer warm, turbid lakes and ponds, and slow-moving parts of rivers, although the dwarf caiman inhabits cool, relatively clear, fast-flowing waterways, often near waterfalls. The Chinese alligator is found in slow-moving, turbid rivers that flow across China's floodplains. The highly adaptable American alligator is found in swamps, rivers and lakes with clear or turbid water. Crocodiles live in marshes, lakes and rivers, and can live in saline environments including estuaries and mangrove swamps. American and saltwater crocodiles swim out to sea. Several extinct species, including the recently extinct Ikanogavialis papuensis, which occurred in coastlines of the Solomon Islands, had marine habitats. Climatic factors locally affect crocodilians' distribution. During the dry season, caimans can be restricted for several months to deep pools in rivers; in the rainy season, much of the savanna in the Orinoco Llanos is flooded, and they disperse widely across the plain. West African crocodiles in the deserts of Mauritania mainly live in gueltas and floodplains but they retreat underground and to rocky shelters, and enter aestivation during the driest periods.

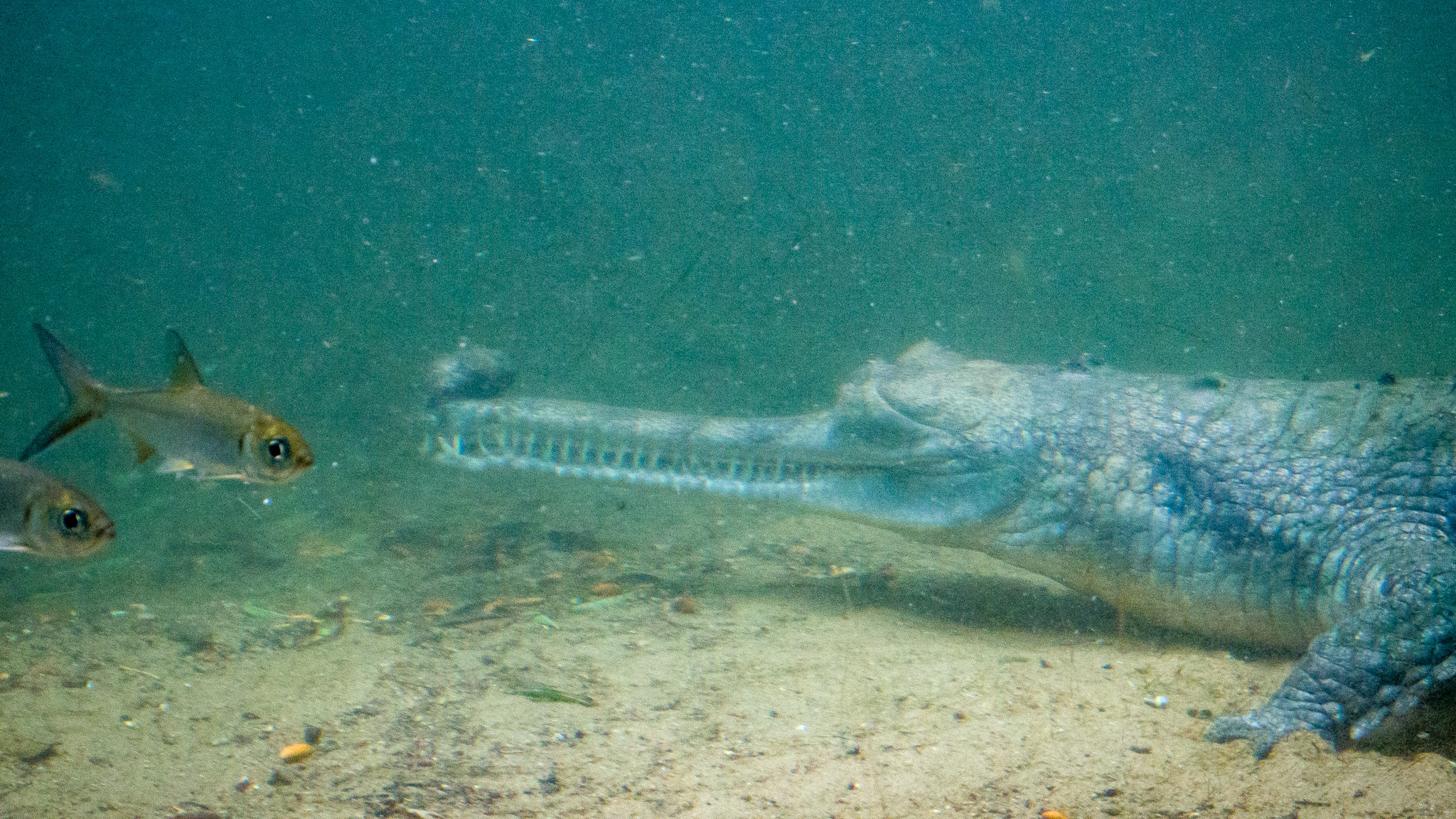
Gharial underwater

Crocodilians also use terrestrial habitats such as forests, savannas, grasslands and deserts. Dry land is used for basking, nesting and escaping from temperature extremes. Several species make use of shallow burrows on land to keep cool or warm, depending on the environment. Four species of crocodilians climb trees to bask in areas lacking a shoreline. Tropical rainforests bordering rivers and lakes inhabited by crocodilians are of great importance to them, creating microhabitats where they can flourish. The roots of the trees absorb rainwater and slowly release it back into the environment. This keeps crocodilian habitat moist during the dry season while preventing flooding during the wet season.

== Behaviour and life history ==
Adult crocodilians are typically territorial and solitary. Individuals may guard basking spots, nesting sites, feeding areas, nurseries, and overwintering sites. Male saltwater crocodiles defend areas with several female nesting sites year-round. Some species are occasionally gregarious, particularly during droughts, when several individuals gather at remaining water sites. Individuals of some species may share basking sites at certain times of the day.

=== Feeding ===
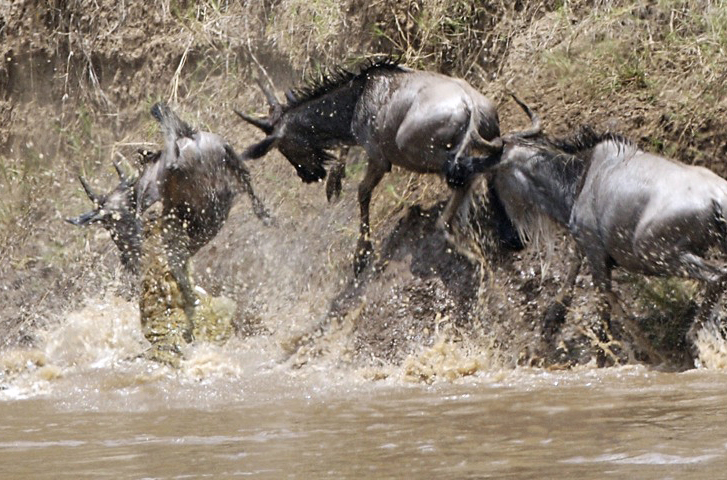
Nile crocodile ambushing migrating wildebeest crossing the Mara River

Crocodilians are largely carnivorous. The diets of species varies with snout shape and tooth sharpness. Species with sharp teeth and long, slender snouts, like the Indian gharial and Australian freshwater crocodile, are specialized for snapping fish, insects, and crustaceans. Extremely broad-snouted species with blunt teeth, like the Chinese alligator and the broad-snouted caiman, are equipped for crushing hard-shelled molluscs. Species whose snouts and teeth are intermediate between these two forms, such as the saltwater crocodile and American alligator, have generalized diets and opportunistically feed on invertebrates, fish, amphibians, reptiles, birds and mammals. Though mostly carnivorous, several species of crocodilian have been observed consuming fruit, and this may play a role in seed dispersal.

In general, crocodilians are stalk-and-ambush predators, though hunting strategies vary between species and their prey. Terrestrial prey is stalked from the water's edge, and grabbed and drowned. Gharials and other fish-eating species sweep their jaws from side-to-side to snatch prey; these animals can leap out of water to catch birds, bats and leaping fish. A small prey animal can be killed by whiplash as the predator shakes its head. When foraging for fish in shallow water, caiman use their tails and bodies to herd fish and may dig for bottom-dwelling invertebrates. The smooth-fronted caiman will leave water to hunt terrestrial prey.

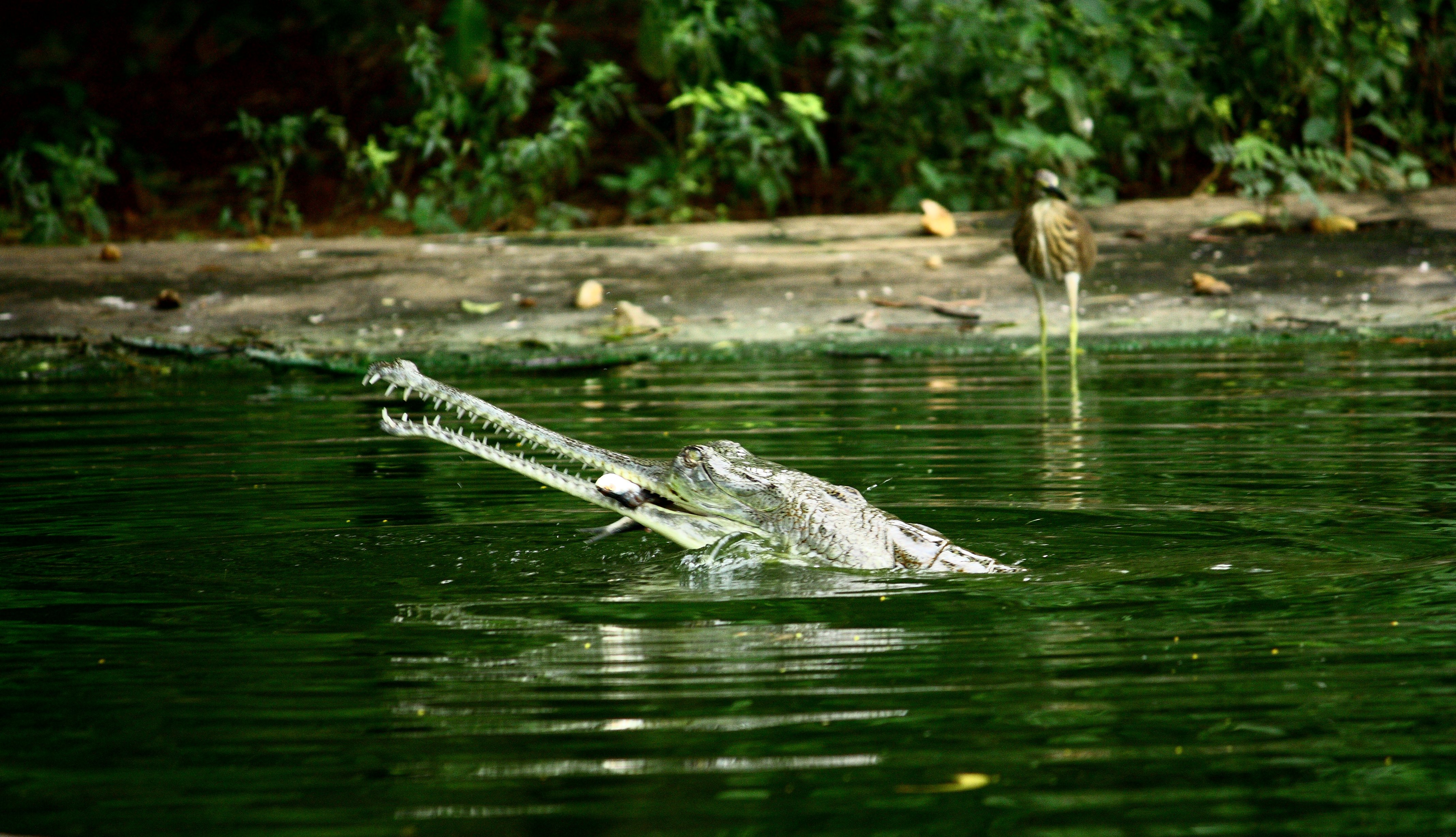
A gharial eating a fish

Crocodilians are unable to chew and need to swallow food whole, so prey that is too large to swallow is torn into pieces. Crocodilians may be unable to deal with a large animal with a thick hide, and may wait until it becomes putrid and comes apart more easily. To tear a chunk of tissue from a large carcass, a crocodilian continuously spins its body while holding prey with its jaws, a manoeuvre that is known as the death roll. During cooperative feeding, some individuals may hold onto prey while others perform the roll. The animals do not fight, and each retires with a piece of flesh and awaits its next feeding turn. After feeding together, individuals may depart alone. Crocodilians typically consume prey with their heads above water. The food is held with the tips of the jaws, tossed towards the back of the mouth by an upward jerk of the head and then gulped down. There is no hard evidence crocodilians cache kills for later consumption.

=== Reproduction and parenting ===
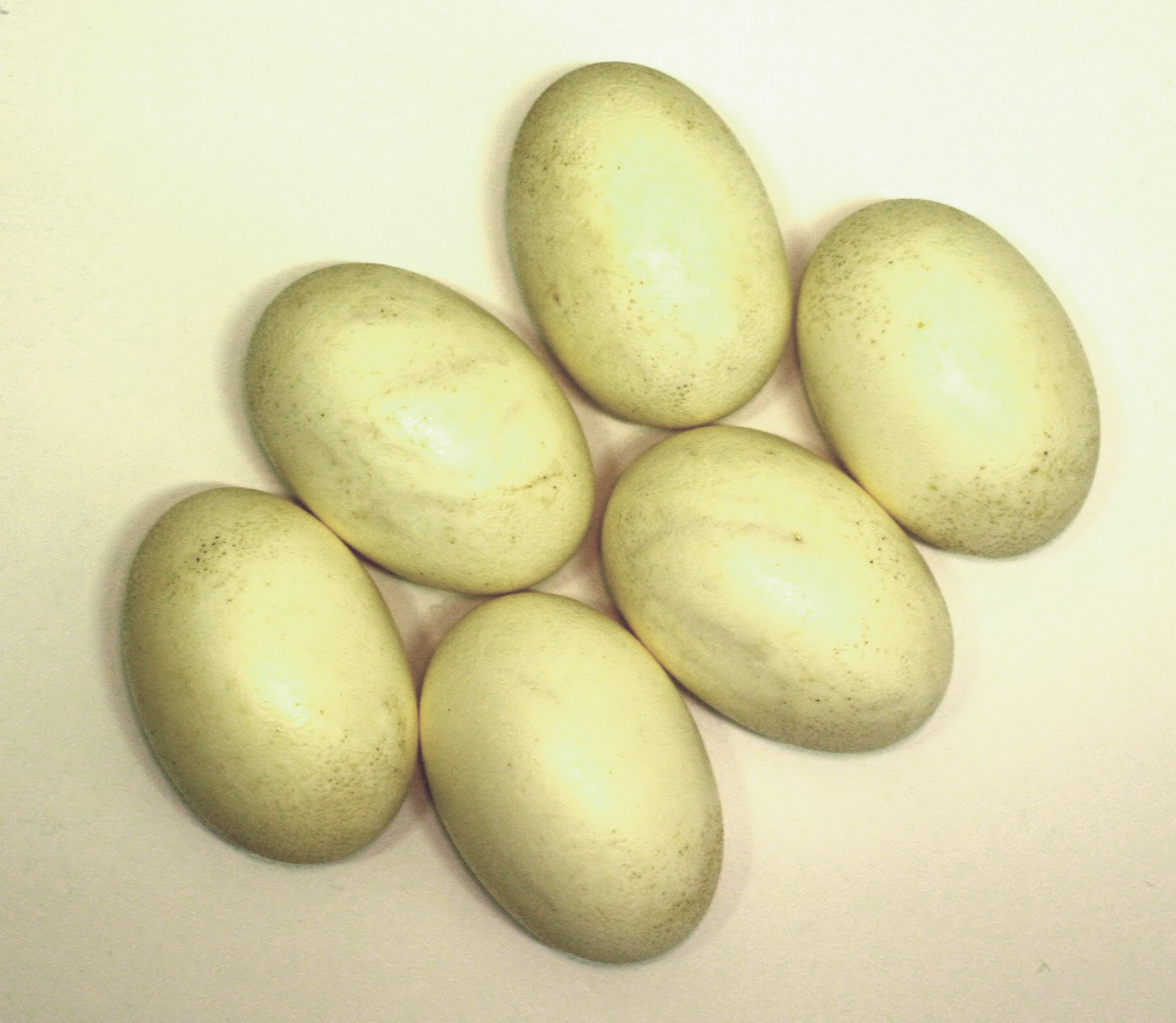
Nile crocodile eggs

Crocodilians are generally polygynous, and individual males try to mate with as many females as they can. Monogamous pairings of American alligators have been recorded. Dominant male crocodilians patrol and defend territories, which contain several females. Males of some species, like the American alligator, try to attract females with elaborate courtship displays. During courtship, crocodilian males and females may rub against each other, circle around, and perform swimming displays. Copulation typically occurs in water. When a female is ready to mate, she arches her back while her head and tail dip underwater. The male rubs across the female's neck and grasps her with his hindlimbs, and places his tail underneath hers so their cloacas align and his penis can be inserted. Intermission can last up to 15 minutes, during which time the pair continuously submerge and surface. While dominant males usually monopolise females, single American alligator clutches can be sired by three different males.

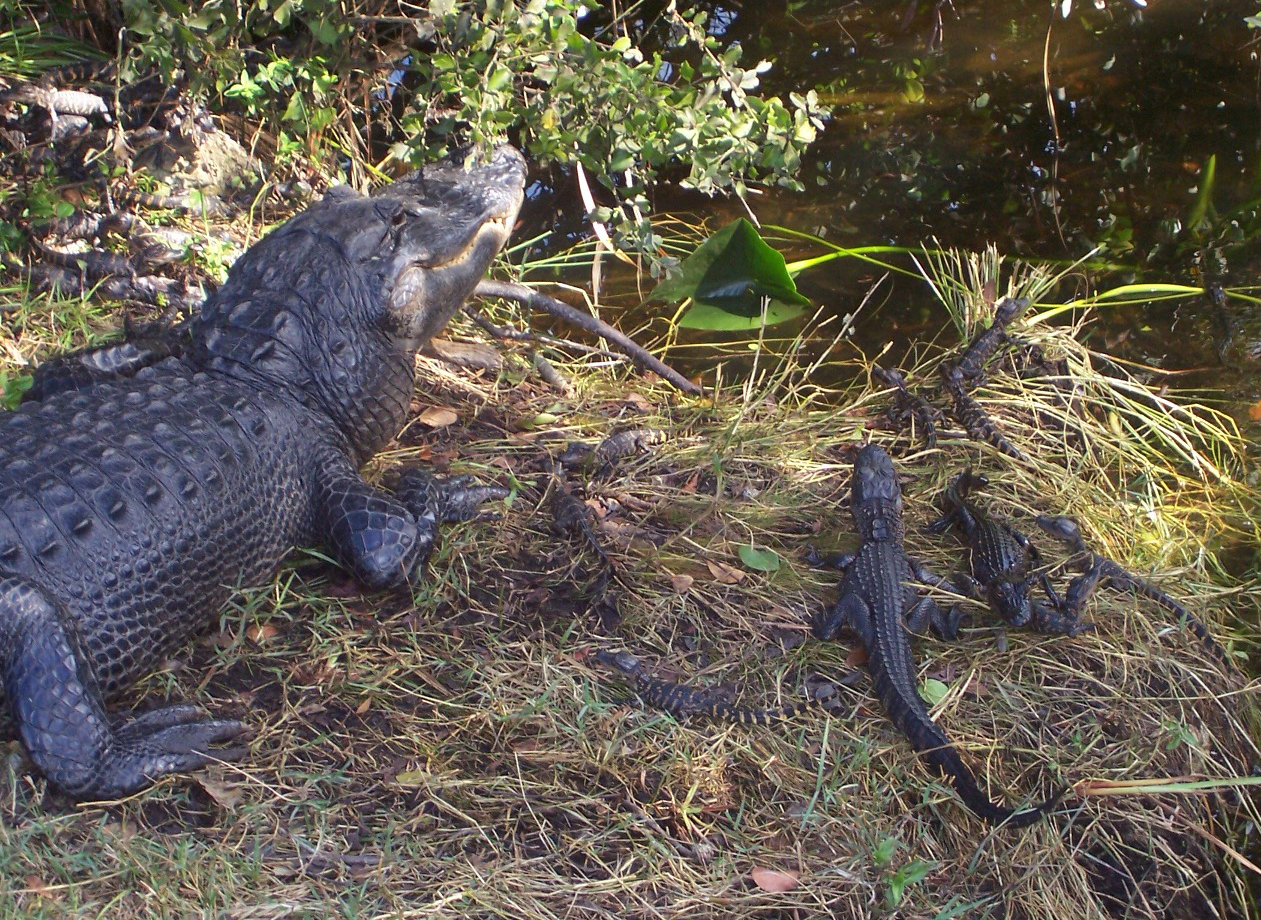
Mother American alligator with nest and young

Depending on the species, female crocodilians may construct either holes or mounds as nests, the latter made from vegetation, litter, sand or soil. Nests are typically found near dens or caves. Those made by different females are sometimes close to each other, particularly in hole-nesting species. Clutches may contain between ten and fifty eggs. Crocodilian eggs are protected by hard shells made of calcium carbonate. The incubation period is two to three months. The sex of the developing, incubating young is temperature dependent; constant nest temperatures above 32 °C (90 °F) produce more males, while those below 31 °C (88 °F) produce more females. Sex in crocodilians may be established in a short period of time, and nests are subject to changes in temperature. Most natural nests produce hatchlings of both sexes, though single-sex clutches occur.

All of the hatchlings in a clutch may leave the nest on the same night. Crocodilians are unusual among reptiles in the amount of parental care provided after the young hatch. The mother helps excavate hatchlings from the nest and carries them to water in her mouth. Newly hatched crocodilians gather together and follow their mother. Both male and female adult crocodilians will respond to vocalizations by hatchlings. Female spectacled caimans in the Venezuelan Llanos are known to leave their young in nurseries or crèches, and one female guards them. Hatchlings of some species tend to bask in a group during the day and start to forage separately in the evening. The time it takes young crocodilians to reach independence can vary. For American alligators, groups of young associate with adults for one-to-two years while juvenile saltwater and Nile crocodiles become independent in a few months.

=== Communication ===
Alligator bellow
Alligator bellow, ogg/Vorbis format.

Another alligator bellow
Alligator bellow, ogg/Vorbis format.

Alligator hiss
Alligator hiss ogg/Vorbis format.

Crocodilians are the most vocal of the non-avian reptiles. They can communicate with sounds, including barks, bellows, chirps, coughs, growls, grunts, hisses, moos, roars, toots and whines. Young start communicating with each other before they are hatched. It has been shown the young will repeat, one after another, a light tapping noise near the nest. This early communication may help young to hatch simultaneously. After breaking out of the egg, a juvenile produces yelps and grunts, either spontaneously or as a result of external stimuli. Even unrelated adults respond quickly to juvenile distress calls.

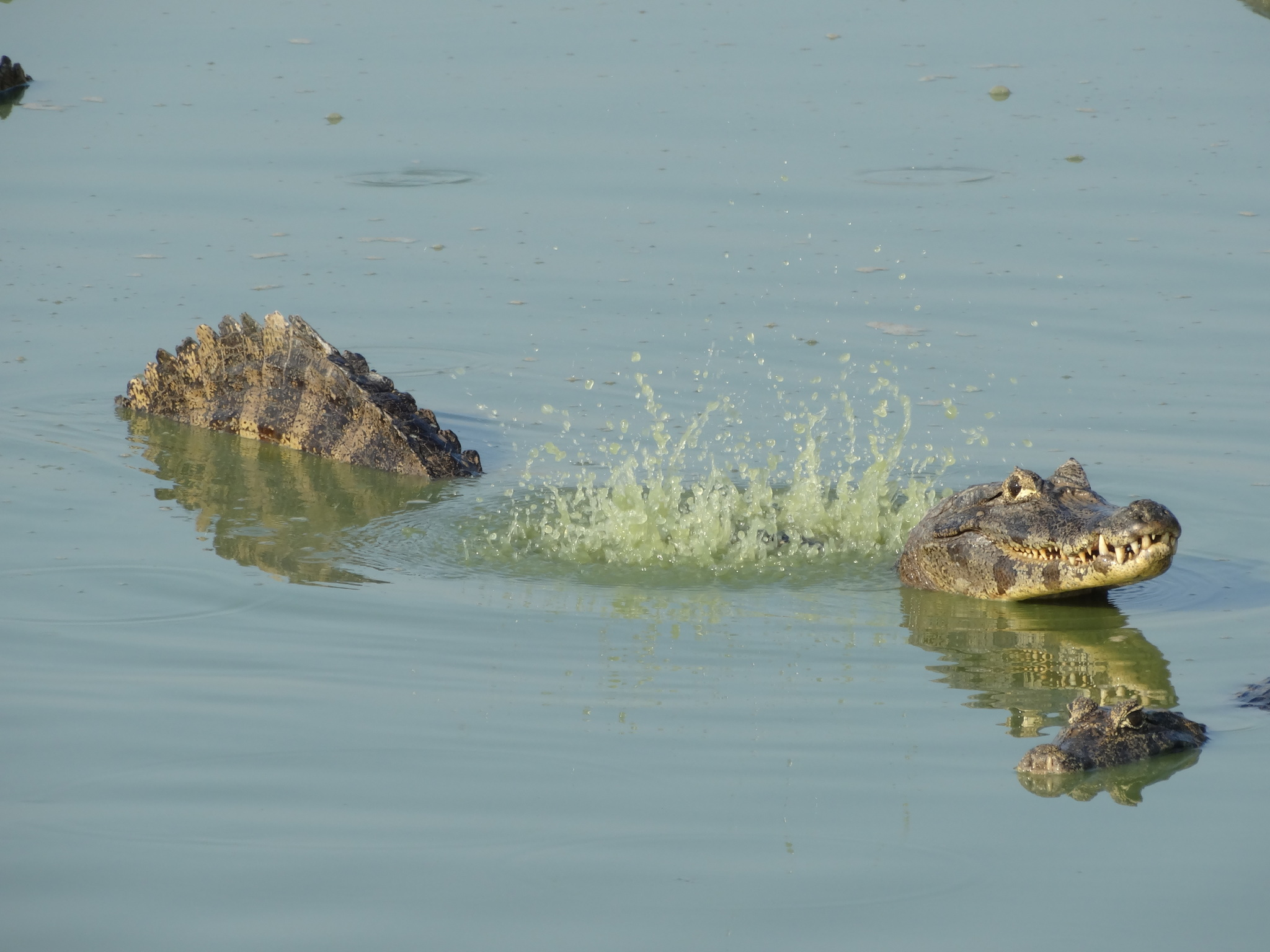
Yacare caiman bellowing

Juveniles are highly vocal, both when scattering in the evening and congregating in the morning. Nearby adults, presumably the parents, may warn young of predators or alert them to the presence of food. The range and quantity of vocalisations vary between species. Alligators and caimans are the noisiest while some crocodile species are almost completely silent. In some crocodile species, individuals "roar" at others when they get too close. The American alligator is exceptionally noisy; it emits a series of up to seven throaty bellows, each a couple of seconds long, at ten-second intervals. It also makes various grunts, growls and hisses. Males create vibrations in water to send out infrasonic signals that attract females and intimidate rivals. The enlarged boss of the male gharial may serve as a sound resonator.

The head slap is another form of acoustic communication. This typically starts when an animal in water elevates its snout and remaining stationary. After some time, the jaws are sharply opened then clamped shut with a biting motion that makes a loud, slapping sound that is immediately followed by a loud splash, after which the head may immerse below the surface and blow bubbles from the throat or nostrils. Some species then roar while others slap water with their tails. Episodes of head slapping spread through the group. The purpose varies and it seems have a social function, and is also used in courtship. Dominant individuals intimidate rivals by swimming at the surface and displaying their large body size, and subordinates submit by holding their head forward above water with the jaws open and then flee below.

=== Growth and mortality ===
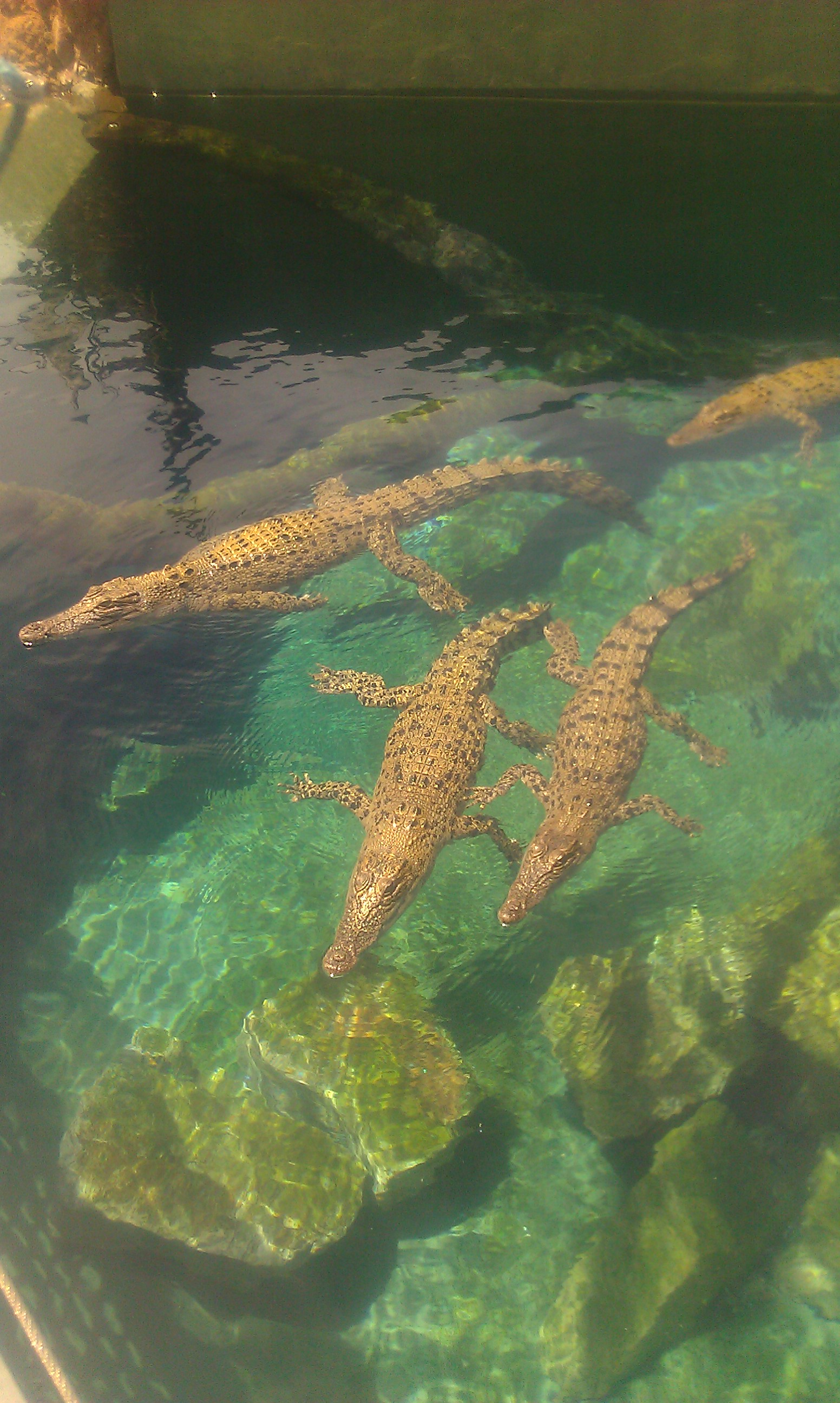
Young saltwater crocodiles in captivity

Eggs and hatchlings have a high death rate, and nests face threats from floods, drying, overheating, and predators. Flooding is a major cause of failure of crocodilians to successfully breed; nests are submerged, developing embryos are deprived of oxygen and juveniles are swept away. Despite the maternal care they receive, eggs and hatchlings are commonly lost to predation. Predators, both mammalian and reptilian, may raid nests and eat crocodilian eggs. After hatching and reaching water, young are still under threat.

In addition to terrestrial predators, young are subject to aquatic attacks by fish. Birds take their toll, and malformed individuals are unlikely to survive. In northern Australia, the survival rate for saltwater crocodile hatchlings is 25 percent but this improves with each year of life, reaching up to 60 percent by year five. Mortality rates among subadults and adults are low, though they are occasionally preyed upon by large cats and snakes. Elephants and hippopotamuses may defensively kill crocodiles. Authorities are uncertain how much cannibalism occurs among crocodilians. Adults do not normally eat their own offspring but there is some evidence of subadults feeding on juveniles, while subadults may be preyed on by adults. Adults appear more likely to protect juveniles and may chase away subadults from nurseries. Rival male Nile crocodiles sometimes kill each other during the breeding season.

Growth in hatchlings and young crocodilians depends on the food supply. Animals reach sexual maturity at a certain length, regardless of age. Saltwater crocodiles reach maturity at 2.2–2.5 m (7–8 ft) for females and 3 m (10 ft) for males. Australian freshwater crocodiles take ten years to reach maturity at 1.4 m (4 ft 7 in). The spectacled caiman matures earlier, reaching its mature length of 1.2 m (4 ft) in four to seven years. Crocodilians continue to grow throughout their lives; males in particular continue to gain weight as they age, but this is mostly in the form of extra girth rather than length. Crocodilians can live for 35–75 years; their age can be determined by growth rings in their bones.

=== Cognition ===
Crocodilians are among the most cognitively complex non-avian reptiles. Embryological studies of developing amniotes have shown similar brain structures in the telencephalon between crocodilians, mammals and birds. Accordingly, several behaviours that were once thought to be unique to mammals and birds have been recently discovered in crocodilians. Some crocodilian species have been observed using sticks and branches to lure nest-building birds, though other authors have argued the purpose, if any, of stick-displaying is at best ambiguous. Several species have been observed to hunt cooperatively, herding and chasing prey. Play, or the free, intrinsically motivated activity of young individuals, has been observed on numerous occasions in crocodilians in captive and wild settings; young alligators and crocodiles regularly engage in object play and social play. Not all higher social behaviours are endemic across these clades; a 2023 study of a tinamou bird and American alligator test subjects found alligators do not appear to engage in visual perspective-taking like the birds. Some researchers have proposed an increase in the use of crocodilians as test animals in comparative cognition studies.

== Interactions with humans ==
=== Attacks ===
Crocodilians are opportunistic predators that are at their most dangerous in water and on shorelines. Several species are known to attack humans and may do so to defend their territories, nests or young; these attacks occur either unintentionally while the animal is attacking domestic animals such as dogs, or deliberately for food. Large crocodilians can take prey as big as or bigger than humans. Most of the data about such attacks involve the saltwater crocodile, the Nile crocodile, the mugger crocodile, the American crocodile, the American alligator and the black caiman. Other species that often attack humans are Morelet's crocodile and the spectacled caiman.

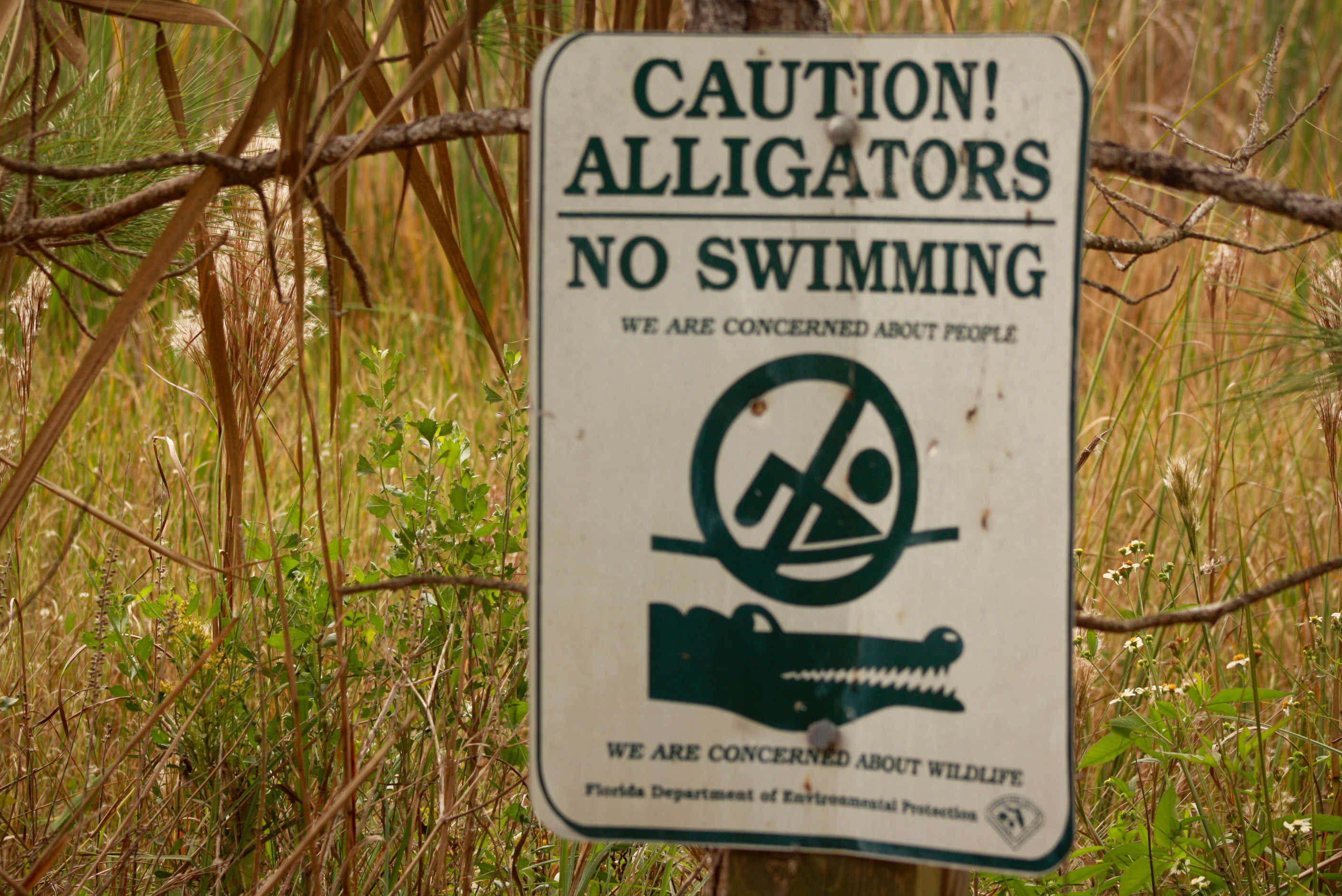
Sign in Florida warning of alligators

It is estimated over 1,000 attacks by the Nile crocodile occurred between 2010 and 2020, almost 70% of which were fatal. The species is considered to be the most dangerous large predator in Africa, particularly because it is both widespread and numerous. It can easily sneak up on people or domestic animals at the edge of water. Fishers, bathers, waders and those washing clothes are particularly vulnerable. Once grabbed and dragged into water, it is unlikely the victim will escape. Analysis of attacks show most such attacks take place when crocodiles are guarding nests or newly hatched young.

Saltwater crocodiles have been implicated in over 1,300 attacks on humans between 2010 and 2020, almost half of which were fatal. Animals of various sizes may attack humans but large males are generally responsible for fatalities. Large animals require large prey, and humans are the correct size. Most victims of attacks by saltwater crocodile attacks have been in water but they occasionally occur on land. Saltwater crocodiles sometimes attack boats but do not usually appear to be targeting the occupants. Attacks occur when a human encroaches on the crocodile's territory. American alligators were responsible for 127 recorded attacks between 2010 and 2020, only six of which were fatal. Alligators are considered to be less aggressive than Nile and saltwater crocodiles, but the increase in density of the human population in the Everglades has brought people and alligators into proximity, increasing the risk of alligator attacks.

=== Uses ===
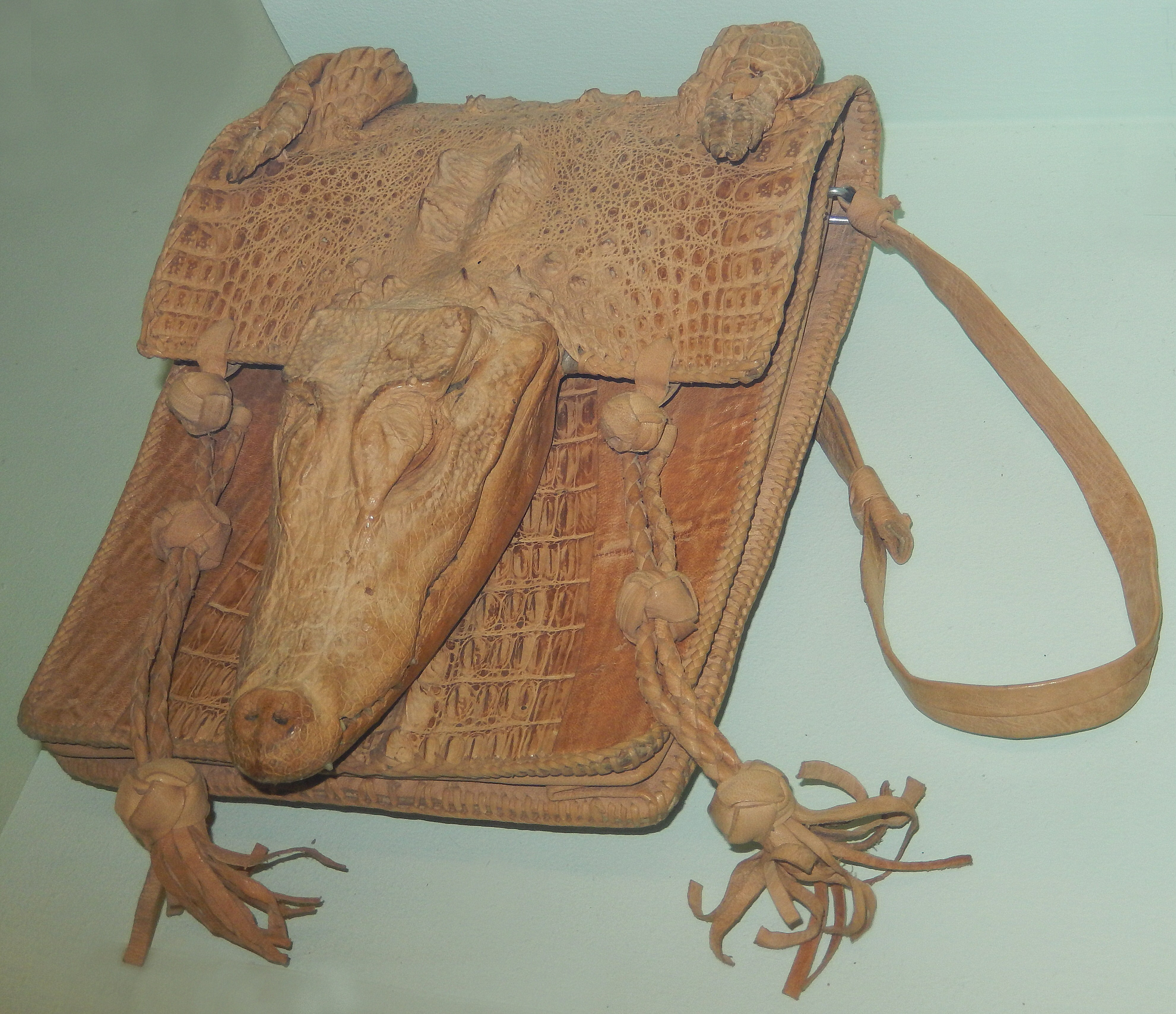
Handbag made from skin of dwarf crocodile at the Natural History Museum, London.

Crocodilians have been hunted for their skin, meat and bones. Their tough skin has been used to make handbags, coats, footwear, wallets and other items. The meat has been compared to that of chicken and may be used as an aphrodisiac. The bones, teeth and pickled heads of crocodilians are used as souvenirs, while other tissues and fluids are ingredients in traditional medicine. Crocodile farms have been established to meet the demand for crocodilian products; species bred on these farms are listed under Appendix II of CITES, which allows regulated trade. A study examining alligator farms in the United States showed they have generated significant conservation gains and poaching of wild alligators has greatly diminished.

Several species of crocodilian are traded as exotic pets. They are appealing when young but crocodilians do not make good pets; they grow large, and are dangerous and expensive to keep. As they grow older, pet crocodilians are often abandoned by their owners, and feral populations of spectacled caimans exist in the United States and Cuba. Most countries have strict regulations for keeping these reptiles.

The blood of alligators and crocodiles contains peptides with antibiotic properties that may contribute to future antibacterial drugs. Cartilage from farm-raised crocodiles is used in research aiming to 3D-print new cartilage for humans by mixing human stem cells with liquefied crocodile cartilage after proteins that may trigger the human immune system have been removed.

== Conservation ==
The IUCN Red List of Threatened Species recognises 26 species of crocodilian and classes 11 of them as threatened including:

- Critically Endangered: Chinese alligator, Philippine Crocodile, Orinoco crocodile, Siamese crocodile, Cuban Crocodile, African Slender-snouted crocodile and gharial.
- Endangered: False gharial
- Vulnerable: American crocodile, mugger crocodile, and dwarf crocodile.

The main threat to crocodilians worldwide is human activity, including hunting and habitat destruction. Early in the 1970s, more than 2 million wild crocodilian skins had been traded, depleting the majority of crocodilian populations, in some cases almost to extinction. Starting in 1973, CITES attempted to prevent trade in body parts of endangered animals, such as crocodile skins. This proved to be problematic in the 1980s because in some parts of Africa, crocodiles were abundant and dangerous to humans, and hunting them was legal. At the Conference of the Parties in Botswana in 1983, it was argued on behalf of aggrieved local people the selling of lawfully hunted skins was reasonable. In the late 1970s, crocodile farming began in different countries, starting from eggs taken from the wild. By the 1980s, farmed crocodile skins were produced in sufficient numbers to greatly diminish the unlawful trade in wild crocodilians. By 2000, skins from twelve crocodilian species, whether harvested lawfully in the wild or farmed, were traded by thirty countries and the unlawful trade had almost vanished.

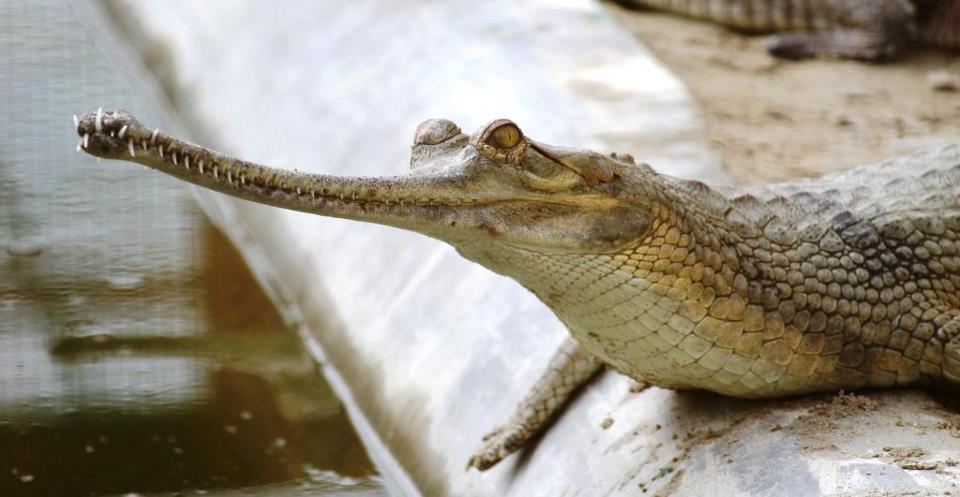
Young gharial in Kukrail Reserve Forest

The gharial was historically widespread in the major river systems of India but has undergone a chronic decline since 1943. Major threats have included prolific hunting, accidental catching and water blockage from dams. The gharial population continues to be threatened by environmental hazards such as heavy metals and protozoan parasites. Protection of nests against egg predators has been shown to increase population numbers. The Chinese alligator was historically widespread in the eastern Yangtze River system but is currently restricted to some areas in south-eastern Anhui due to habitat fragmentation and degradation. The wild population is believed to exist only in small, fragmented ponds. In 1972, the Chinese government declared the species a Class I endangered species and it received the maximum amount of legal protection. Since 1979, captive breeding programmes were established in China and North America, creating a healthy captive population. In 2008, alligators bred in the Bronx Zoo were successfully reintroduced to Chongming Island. The Philippine crocodile may be the most-threatened crocodilian; hunting and destructive fishing habits have reduced its numbers to around 100 individuals by 2009. In the same year, 50 captive-bred crocodiles were released into the wild to help boost the population. Support from local people is crucial for the species' survival.

The American alligator has also undergone serious declines from hunting and habitat loss throughout its range, threatening it with extinction. In 1967, it was listed as an endangered species but the United States Fish and Wildlife Service and state wildlife agencies in the southern United States stepped in and worked towards its recovery. Protection allowed the species to recuperate and in 1987 it was removed from the endangered species list. In Australia, the saltwater crocodile was heavily hunted and was reduced to five percent of its historical numbers in the Northern Territory by 1971. Since then, the species was given legal protections and its numbers had greatly increased by 2001.

== Cultural depictions ==
=== In mythology and folklore ===
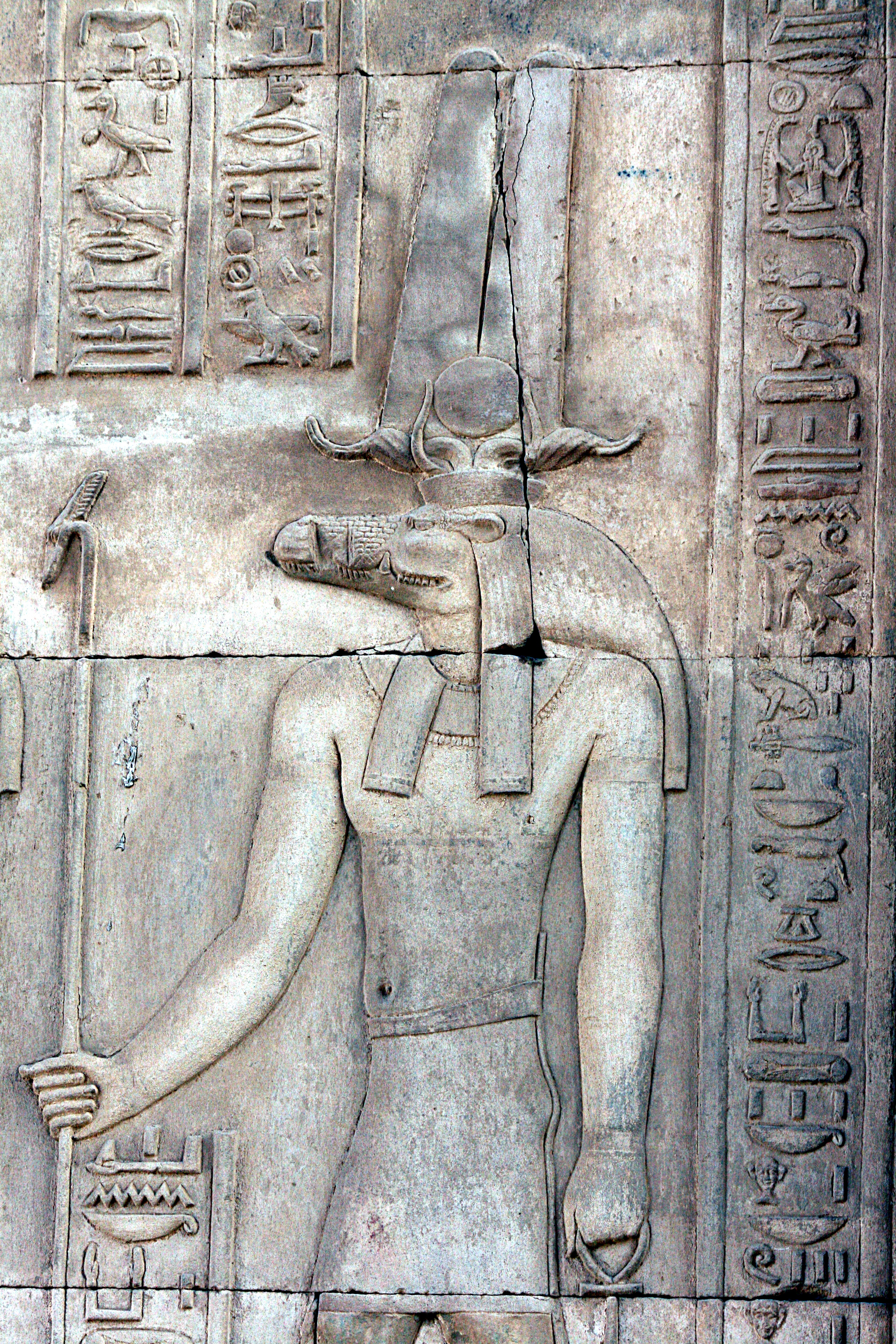
Relief of Egyptian god Sobek

Crocodilians have prominent roles in the narratives of various cultures around the world and may have inspired stories of dragons. In ancient Egyptian religion, both Ammit the devourer of unworthy souls and Sobek the god of power, protection and fertility are represented as having crocodile heads. This reflects the ancient Egyptians' view of the crocodile as both a terrifying predator and an important part of the Nile ecosystem. The crocodile was one of several animals the Egyptians mummified. West African peoples also associated crocodiles with water deities. During the Benin Empire, crocodiles symbolised the power of the oba (king) and linked him to the life-giving rivers. The Leviathan described in the Book of Job may have been based on a crocodile. In Mesoamerica, the Aztecs had a crocodilian god of fertility named Cipactli who protected crops. In Aztec mythology, the earth deity Tlaltecuhtli is said to bond with a "great caiman". The Maya also worshipped crocodilian gods and believed the world is supported on the back of a swimming crocodile.

The gharial features in the folk tales of India. In one story, a gharial and a monkey become friends when the monkey gives the gharial fruit but the friendship ends after the gharial confesses it tried to lure the monkey into a house to eat it. Native American and African American folk tales often pair an alligator with a trickster rabbit, Br'er Rabbit in the African American stories. An Australian Dreamtime story tells of a crocodile ancestor who had fire all to himself until a rainbow bird stole fire-sticks for man, hence the crocodile lives in water.

=== In literature and media ===
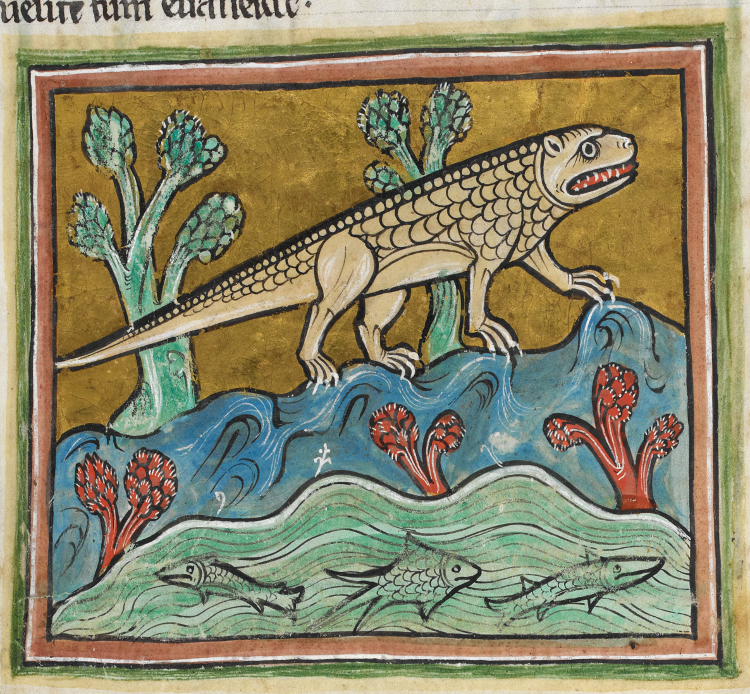
Crocodile in the medieval Rochester Bestiary, late 13th century

Ancient historians have described crocodilians from the earliest written records, though often their descriptions contain as much assumption as observation. The Ancient Greek historian Herodotus (c. 440 BC) described the crocodile in detail, though much of his description is fanciful; he claimed the crocodile would lie with its mouth open to permit a "trochilus" bird, possibly an Egyptian plover, to remove leeches. The crocodile was described in the late-13th century Rochester Bestiary, which is based on classical sources, including Pliny's Historia naturalis (c. 79 AD) and Isidore of Seville's Etymologies. Isidore said the crocodile is named for its saffron colour (Latin croceus, 'saffron') and may be killed by fish with serrated crests sawing into its soft underbelly.

Since the ninth-century text Bibliotheca by Photios I of Constantinople, crocodiles have been reputed to weep for their victims. The story became widely known in 1400 when the English traveller John Mandeville wrote his description of "cockodrills":

In that country [of Prester John] and by all Ind [India] be great plenty of cockodrills, that is a manner of a long serpent, as I have said before. And in the night they dwell in the water, and on the day upon the land, in rocks and in caves. And they eat no meat in all the winter, but they lie as in a dream, as do the serpents. These serpents slay men, and they eat them weeping; and when they eat they move the over jaw, and not the nether jaw, and they have no tongue.

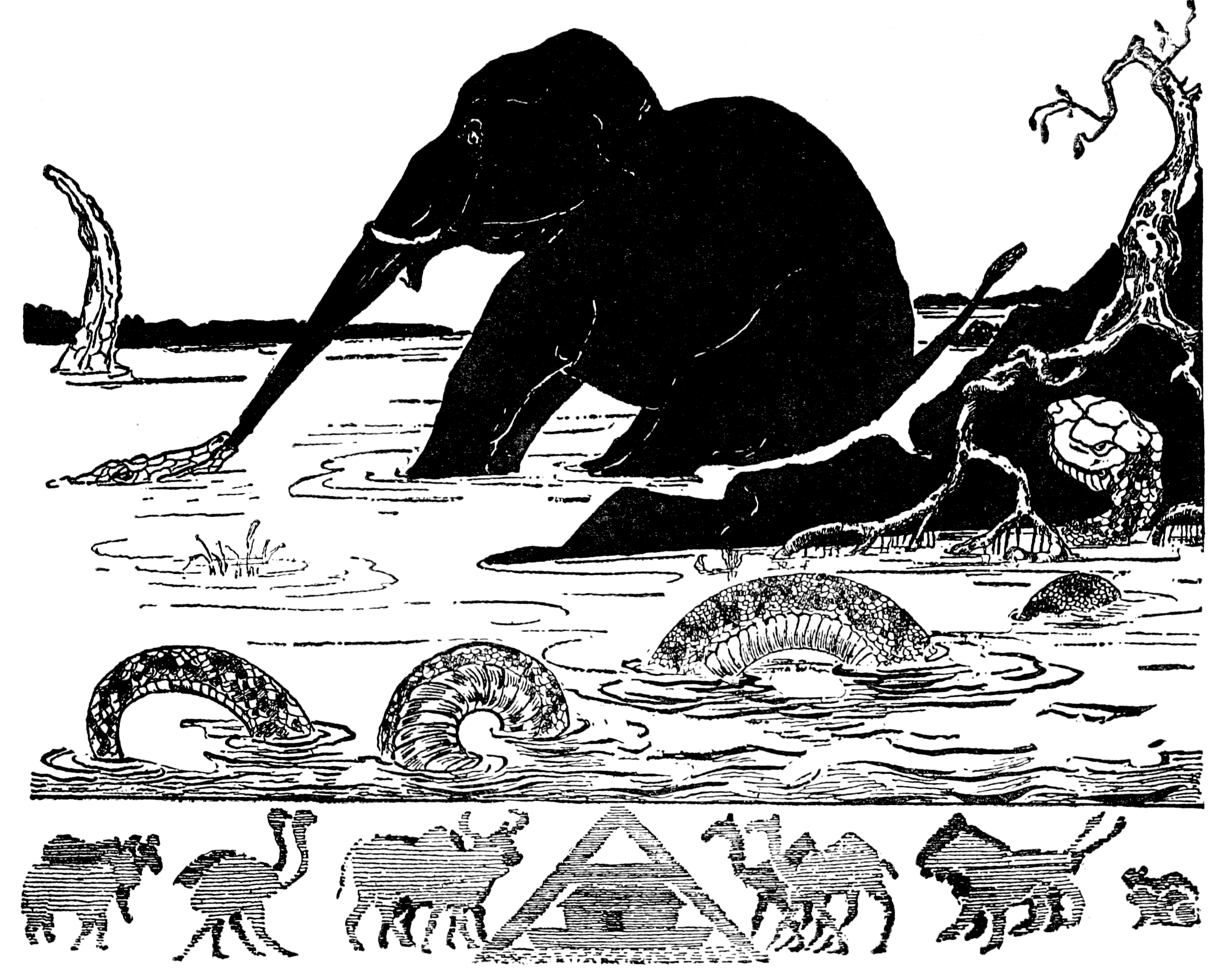
The Crocodile stretching the nose of the Elephant's Child in one of Rudyard Kipling's Just So Stories

Crocodilians have been recurring characters in stories for children, such as Roald Dahl's The Enormous Crocodile (1978) and Emily Gravett's The Odd Egg (2008). Lewis Carroll's Alice's Adventures in Wonderland (1865) contains the poem How Doth the Little Crocodile. In J. M. Barrie's novel Peter and Wendy (1911), Captain Hook losses his hand to a crocodile. In Rudyard Kipling's Just So Stories (1902), the Elephant's Child acquires his trunk by having his nose pulled very hard by a crocodile.

In movies and shows, crocodilians are often represented as dangerous water obstacles or as monstrous man-eaters, as in the horror films Eaten Alive (1977), Alligator (1980), Lake Placid (1999), Crocodile (2000), Primeval (2007) and Black Water (2007). In the film Crocodile Dundee (1986), the title character Mick Dundee's nickname comes from an incident involving a crocodile attack. Some media texts, such as Steve Irwin's wildlife documentary series The Crocodile Hunter, have attempted to portray crocodilians in a more positive or educational tone.
