= Krabisuchus =

Krabisuchus Temporal range: Priabonian

Scientific classification
- Kingdom: Animalia
- Phylum: Chordata
- Class: Reptilia
- Clade: Archosauria
- Order: Crocodilia
- Superfamily: Alligatoroidea
- Clade: Globidonta
- Clade: †Orientalosuchina
- Genus: †Krabisuchus; Martin and Lauprasert, 2010

Type species
- †Krabisuchus siamogallicus Martin and Lauprasert, 2010

Extinct genus of reptiles

Krabisuchus is an extinct genus of alligatoroid crocodylian that lived in what is now Thailand during the Late Eocene. It was first named by paleontologists Jeremy A. Martin and Komsorn Lauprasert in 2010, and the type species is K. siamogallicus. While originally interpreted as a relative of Allognathosuchus, later studies placed Krabisuchus in the clade Orientalosuchina, an enigmatic group of crocodilians from the Cretaceous to Paleogene of Asia with disputed affinities. Fossils have been found from the Krabi Basin of southern Thailand and include mostly cranial and mandibular elements as well as some postcranial remains. Based on these remains Krabisuchus was a relatively small animal with a short and blunt snout. During the Eocene the Krabi Basin was likely covered by dense tropical forest and featured bodies of freshwater like ponds, marshes and swamps that were home to crocodiles and turtles. It has been speculated that Krabisuchus might have been more terrestrial than modern alligators.

== History and naming ==
The fossil remains of Krabisuchus were first discovered by the Electricity Generating Authority of Thailand in three lignite pits within the Krabi Basin of Thailand, with the corresponding sediments likely dating to the Late Eocene. The material was recovered over the course of several field trips between 1989 and 1994 by a collaboration of French and Thai scientists under Varavudh Suteethorn and Eric Buffetaut. Given the overall morphology, the crocodilian fossils were initially thought to represent the genus Allognathosuchus, which at the time was known from Europe and North America. However, since then the status of several species referred to Allognathosuchus has come under scrutiny, with the genus commonly thought to be paraphyletic. This not only affected species that had previously been given distinct genera names that could be resurrected, namely Hassiacosuchus and Navajosuchus, but also the material from the Krabi Basin. Consequently, in 2010 a study was published by Jeremy E. Martin and Komsorn Lauprasert recognizing the Krabi Basin alligatoroid as a distinct genus, which the team named Krabisuchus siamogallicus. As they holotype they chose a complete skull with an attached lower jaw, with several more skull, lower jaw and even postcranial remains all referred to the species.

The genus name of Krabisuchus combines the name of its place of origin, Thailand's Krabi Basin, with the Egyptian "souchos" which means crocodile. The species name meanwhile is composed "Siam" and "Gallicus", both of which are old names for Thailand and France respectively. This means to reference the fact that collaboration between paleontologists from these two countries eventually lead to the description of this animal.

== Description ==
Like other orientalosuchins, Krabisuchus had a short and blunt snout, with the rostrum itself being approximately as long as the back of the head beginning with the eyesockets. The skull is furthermore described as being relatively deep, a condition known as altirostry that is also seen in Arambourgia, Procaimanoidea and Hassiacosuchus. The nares are located at the tip of the snout in typical crocodilian fashion, though they are described as facing much more towards the front rather than just upward.

The nares are surrounded almost entirely by the premaxillae, which form the very tip of the snout. The premaxillae are longer than they are wide and are sloping towards the front of the snout, which contributes to the anterior positioning of the nares. Towards the back the premaxillae meet the maxillae, forming a rather long dorsal process that extends back until the level of the third maxillary tooth. The transition from the premaxilla to the maxilla on the outer side of the snout is marked by the presence of a prominent notch that is also seen in other orientalosuchins as well as members of the genus Crocodylus. Typically, this notch would serve to receive an enlarged dentary tooth, though in the case of Krabisuchus it would appear that such a tooth would instead slide into a pit in the underside of the snout. Another prominent constriction is present behind the fifth maxillary tooth, contributing to the sinuous appearance of the element known as festooning.

The nasal bones are described as being very wide in Krabisuchus, making up an entire third of the maximum snout width. Towards the front of the skull the nasals actually form a process that reaches into the nares, a trait also seen in other orientalosuchins and in a more pronounced manner in modern alligators. Given that the preserved skulls of Krabisuchus are generally crushed, the point of contact between the nasals with the maxillae to either side is not entirely clear. Martin and Lauprasert described that the lacrimal largely prevents the two bones from meeting except for what might be a very narrow region towards the front of the snout. Consequently, in this interpretation the contact between the nasals and the lacrimals would have been especially long, stretching along 2/3rds of the length of the nasals. However, Tobias Massonne and his team later argued that what were initially interpreted as sutures between skull bones actually represented pre-orbital ridges similar to those seen in Orientalosuchus and modern saltwater crocodiles. Towards the back the elongated and tapering prefrontals insert themselves in-between the nasals and the lacrimals, and the frontal bone forms a process that extends in-between the nasals and connects the snout with the skull table.

The eyes of Krabisuchus were large and the small skull table is located much higher than the snout. This gives the skull an altirostral appearance similar to Arambourgia and Procaimanoidea. After forming the medial margins of the eyesockets, the frontal bone enters the skull table and comes into contact with the two postorbital bones and the singular parietal. The contact with the latter is described as concavoconvex and located before the supratemporal fenestrae, meaning that the frontal did not actually contribute to the edge of these openings. The postorbitals form the front corners of the skull, the back of the eyesockets and the upper part of the postorbital bar that separates the eyesockets from the infratemporal fenestrae located on the side of the skull. The squamosals attach behind the postorbitals and are elongated, ultimately making up 2/3rds of the skull table's length. Unlike in Procaimanoidea and Arambourgia, the outer edges of the squamosals run almost parallel to each other, meaning that the structure as a whole is more rectangular than trapezoid. While the squamosals form the outer edges, the parietal is the primary element of the central skull table, filling the space between the two supratemporal fenestrae. Though constricted between the openings, the width of the parietal in this region is still around the same as the space between the eyesockets, if slightly broader. The surface of the parietal varies, being raised at the very edge of the fenestrae, flat between and slightly depressed behind them near the contact with the squamosals. As in other orientalosuchins, the supraoccipital is prominently exposed on the skull table, making up the very back of the element, but does not prevent the parietal from reaching the end of the skull table as in Eurycephalosuchus or Orientalosuchus.

The jugal bone stretches from the maxilla and lacrimal in the front all the way back to the quadratojugal, contributing to the lower edge of the eyesocket and infratemporal fenestra in the process. The jugal also forms the lower part of the postorbital bar, an inset structure that separates the eyesocket and infratemporal fenestra. It has been noted that in Krabisuchus the jugal's contribution to this element is quite substantial, extending fairly high up before coming in contact with the postorbital. The jugal bears a low rim that runs across its upper surface before disappearing roughly at the level of the postorbital bar. Additionally, it's at this point that the jugal as a whole becomes more rod-like in structure, leading into the quadratojugal which contributes the rest of the infratemporal fenestra's margins and runs back along the edge of the skull in contact with the quadrate bone. The quadrate features a lateral (outer) and medial (inner) hemicondyle, with the outer hemicondyle being the larger of the two. Its surface also features a boss that receives the paroccipital process and a medially located foramen aërum.

The underside of the skull features a small incisive foramen and two suborbital fenestrae that are slightly wider than long and overall smaller than the eyesockets. The margins of each fenestra are formed anterolaterally by the maxilla, posterolaterally by the ectopterygoid, posteromedially by the pterygoid and medially by the palatine bone. The paired palatines are located between the fenestrae, generally short but with an anterior process that widens into the space before the fenestrae. The ectopterygoids are located on the outer edge of the skull, contacting the maxillae and overlap the pterygoids. Like the palatines, the paired pterygoid extends into the space between the fenestrae where it contacts the former. The choanae are fully enclosed with their margins lying flush with the surface of the pterygoid, showing no indication that a "neck" would have surrounded them, and the wings of the pterygoid are wider than long.

=== Lower jaw ===
The robust dentary bears a deep constriction that stretches from the enlarged fourth dentary tooth to the twelfth, at which point the tooth row is once again positioned dorsally. Due to this, the posterior teeth of the lower jaw are at about the same height as the first four. The mandibular symphysis, the part of the mandible where the two halves connect, is described as strong and extends until the fifth dentary tooth. The splenial comes in contact with the posteriormost part of the symphysis and increases greatly in height beginning with the constricted part of the mandible, eventually reaching the top of the toothrow close to the last few teeth. The angular forms the lower part of the posterior mandible, below the external mandibular fenestra. On the inner side of the lower jaw, it actually prevents the splenial from coming in contact with the foramen intermandibularis caudalis. The surangular sits above the angular, contributing to the posterior corner of the mandibular fenestra, which is placed higher than the anterior end, therefore giving it an oblique appearance. The lightly curved retroarticular process is quite distinct in Krabisuchus as it is relatively downturned and projects posteriorily, whereas in other modern crocodiles it's curved far more upwards.

=== Dentition ===
The tooth count of the premaxilla is only visible in one specimen, which shows that Krabisuchus had five teeth in either premaxilla. The exact number of maxillary teeth is unknown, though a minimum of 14 were present with the fourth being the largest. The tooth count of the lower jaw is better understood, with there being a total of 18 dentary teeth, with the fourth dentary tooth being the largest in the series. The subsequent teeth, which are placed in the deep constriction that characterizes the dentary of Krabisuchus, are much smaller until they reach the 13th tooth socket alveolus, which alongside the 14th is described as approaching the fourth dentary tooth in size.

Overall, the teeth of Krabisuchus appear to have been arranged in an overbite, with the teeth of the lower jaw sliding into occlusal pits that sit lingual to the teeth of the upper jaw. In crocodilians, the largest dentary tooth commonly slides into a prominent notch that clearly separates the teeth of the premaxilla and maxilla. Although such a notch is known in Krabisuchus, articulated specimen indicate that it did not actually receive the enlarged dentary tooth as is the case in modern crocodiles. Instead, said tooth appears to have slid into a pit that was present in this region, subsequently obscuring the tooth when the jaws were closed.

The teeth in the front of the snout, both those of the premaxilla, maxilla and dentary, are generally described as conical, with those of the dentary and maxilla furthermore being characterized by being short. Overall they are more robust than those of the modern American Alligator and are known to bear cutting edges as well as numerous small ridges. The teeth further back in the jaw meanwhile have been described as low crowned and bulbous.

=== Postcranial material ===
Various elements of the postcranial skeleton of Krabisuchus are known including osteoderms, vertebrae, the phalanx, ilium, scapula and femur. At least two osteoderm types could be identified, the first of which consisting of square-shaped keeled osteoderms with a moderately concave underside that likely belonged to the dorsal armor. The second type bears an even more prominent keel of varying position and possesses a ventral surface that is described as deeply concave, Martin and Lauprasert suggest that these osteoderms might have been formed the armor of the neck, given that they do not preserve sutures as the dorsal armor does. In both osteoderm types the keel actually extends behind the posterior edge of the bony plate. The osteoderms feature articular surfaces on two sides, which for one suggests that the dorsal armor would have consisted of multiple rows in articulation with one another. At the same time, such surfaces are absent in the front and back, which indicates that they did not articulate down the length of the body but instead each osteoderm overlapped the one behind it.

=== Size ===
Krabisuchus was a small alligatoroid growing no larger than 2 metres (6.6 ft) in length, making it smaller than modern American alligators.

== Classification ==
Krabisuchus was originally classified as a member of Alligatoroidea, with the results of the phylogeny run using the dataset of Salisbury et al. (2006) placing it at the very base of the clade while the results using Brochu's matrix place it in a more derived position within Alligatorinae in a clade alongside Allognathosuchus, Procaimanoidea and Arambourgia, with the latter interpretation having been favored by the team.

While later studies supported its placement among alligatoroids, the specifics of its relationship with other members of this group did not follow the initial hypothesis of Martin and Lauprasert. Skutschas et al. (2014) recovered it as a basal member of Alligatoridae in a polytomy alongside Allognathosuchus, Hassiacosuchus, Navajosuchus and the Maoming alligator (later described as Dongnanosuchus), but outside of the major clades Alligatorinae and Caimaninae (the other major group of alligatoroids). Wang et al. (2016) and Wu et al. (2018) only managed to recover poorly resolved trees that left the relationship among alligatoroids somewhat ambiguous, as Krabisuchus was recovered as a part of an enormous polytomy featuring both alligatorines and caimanines of all sorts. In their description of Jiangxisuchus, Li and colleagues meanwhile recovered Krabisuchus as an early member of the Caimaninae.

A rash in papers published throughout the 2010s, consisting of both redescriptions and new discoveries, eventually lead to the 2019 study by Massonne et al.. In this work, the team did not only describe yet another Asian alligatoroid, Orientalosuchus, but also proposed that many of the previously recognized forms actually formed a monophyletic clade they named Orientalosuchina. This clade was defined as containing the newly named Orientalosuchus, the reported alligatoroids Krabisuchus and Protoalligator as well as the putative crocodyloids Jiangxisuchus and Eoalligator (though Eoalligator had historically also been regarded as an alligatoroid). Massonne and colleagues recovered Orientalosuchina as part of a basal offshoot of Globidonta and with Krabisuchus and Orientalosuchus as each others closest relatives. Later studies also placed the newly named genera Dongnanosuchus and Eurycephalosuchus within Orientalosuchina, continuing to support the idea of Cretaceous to Paleogene alligatoroids in Asia forming a monophyletic clade. Both these studies place Krabisuchus as the basalmost member of the group, followed by Protoalligator and a large polytomy that contains all the other taxa alongside the clade formed by Eoalligator and Jiangxisuchus. The phylogenetic tree that accompanied the description of Eurycephalosuchus is shown below.

- - Alligatoroidea
    - †Leidyosuchus
    - - †Deinosuchus
      - †Diplocynodon
      - Globidonta
        - †Orientalosuchina
          - †Krabisuchus siamogallicus
          - - †Protoalligator huiningensis
            - - †Orientalosuchus naduongenis
              - †Dongnanosuchus hsui
              - †Eurycephalosuchus gannanensis
              - - †Jiangxisuchus nankangensis
                - †Eoalligator chunyii
        - Alligatoridae

However even the placement within Alligatoroidea is not supported by all studies. Chabrol et al. (2024) managed to recover both a placement within Longirostres and one as basal alligatoroids in their redescription of Crocodylus palaeindicus. Both results also see Orientalosuchina significantly cut down relative to Massonne's original definition, no longer including Jiangxisuchus, Eoalligator or Protoalligator. In the tree that recovered the clade as closer to crocodyloids, Krabisuchus was found as the sister taxon to Eurycephalosuchus, with their clade forming a separate branch to that formed by Orientalosuchus and Dongnanosuchus. In the alligatoroid interpretation meanwhile, the group is not split in two clades but instead features Eurycephalosuchus and Krabisuchus as successive offshoots leading up to Orientalosuchus and Dongnanosuchus.

- Longirostres
  - - - †Eurycephalosuchus gannanensis
      - †Krabisuchus siamogallicus
    - - †Orientalosuchus naduongenis
      - †Dongnanosuchus hsui
  - - Crocodyloidea
    - Gavialoidea

- - - - †Qianshanosuchus
      - †Asiatosuchus depressifrons
    - - †Asiatosuchus germanicus
      - †Crocodylus affinis
  - - †Planocraniidae
    - Alligatoroidea
      - - †Eurycephalosuchus gannanensis
        - - †Krabisuchus siamogallicus
          - - †Orientalosuchus naduongenis
            - †Dongnanosuchus hsui
      - other alligatoroids

Yet another interpretation comes from Ristevski et al. (2023), who in some of their phylogenies recovered orientalosuchins as not only being crocodyloids but actually being deeply nested within the clade Mekosuchinae, traditionally interpreted as being endemic to Australia and select islands in the South Pacific. Within this topology, which was recovered in two out of eight analysis, orientalosuchins clade together with small-bodied mekosuchines. More specifically, most of them form a monophyletic clade with Krabisuchus as the basalmost taxon similar to the results of Shan et al. (2021) and Wu et al. (2022). However, most other analysis of this study recover more conventional results with orientalosuchins not included within Mekosuchinae.

- Crocodilia
  - Alligatoroidea
  - - †Planocraniidae
    - - - †Prodiplocynodon
        - - - †"Crocodylus" affinis
            - †"Crocodylus" depressifrons
          - - †"Crocodylus" acer
            - †Brachyuranochampsa
          - Longirostres
            - Gavialoidea
            - Crocodyloidea
      - - †Asiatosuchus germanicus
        - Mekosuchinae
          - - †Kalthifrons
            - - - †Quinkana meboldi
                - - †Quinkana fortirostrum
                  - †Quinkana timara
              - - - †Paludirex gracilis
                  - †Paludirex vincenti
                - - †Baru wickeni
                  - †Baru darrowi
          - - Orientalosuchina
              - †Krabisuchus
              - - †Orientalosuchus
                - - †Jiangxisuchus
                  - †Eoalligator
            - - †Dongnanosuchus
              - - †"Baru" huberi
                - - †Volia
                  - †Trilophosuchus
                  - - †Mekosuchus sanderi
                    - †Mekosuchus whitehunterensis
                    - †Mekosuchus inexpectatus

== Paleobiology ==
=== Paleoenvironment ===
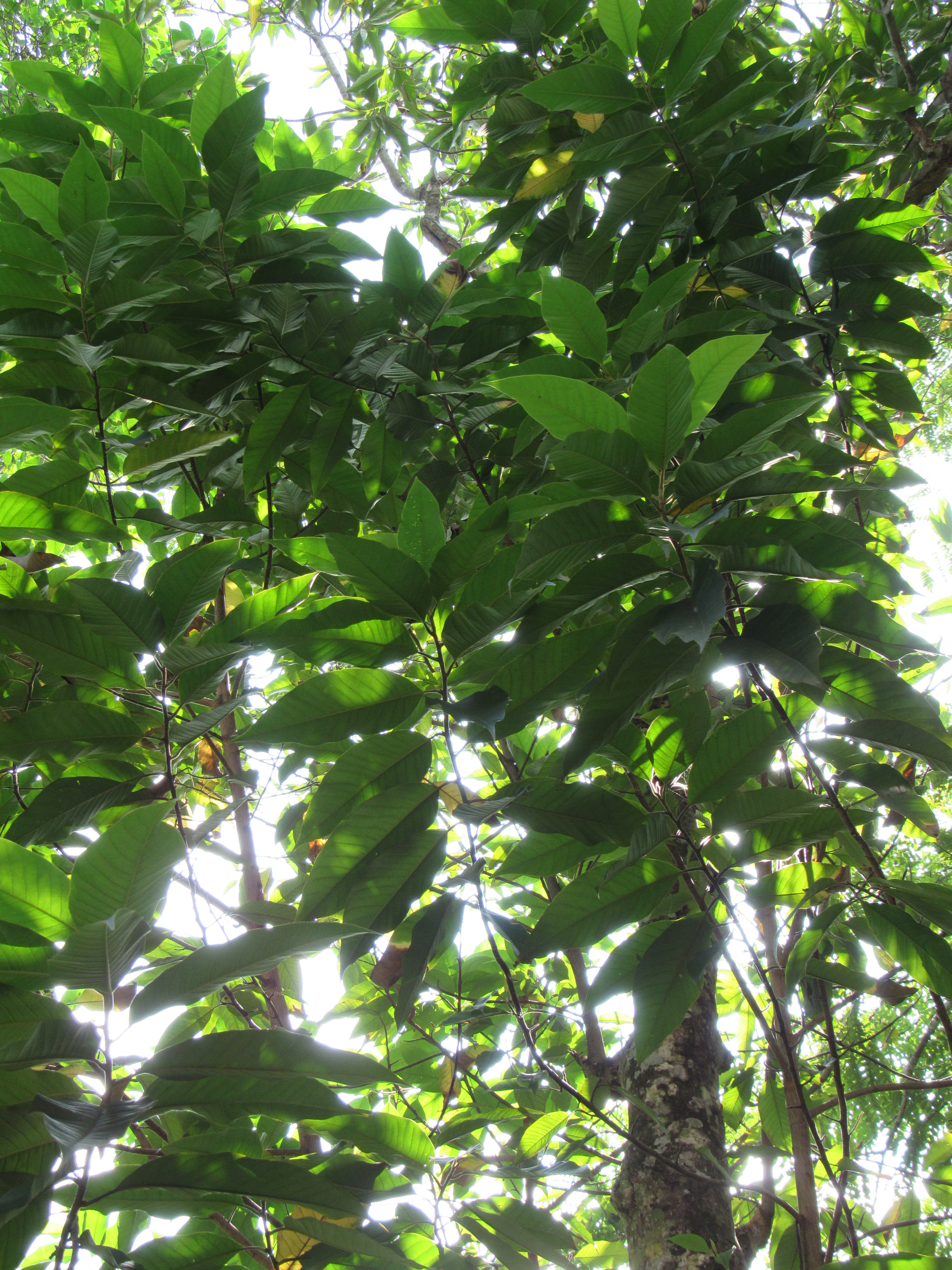
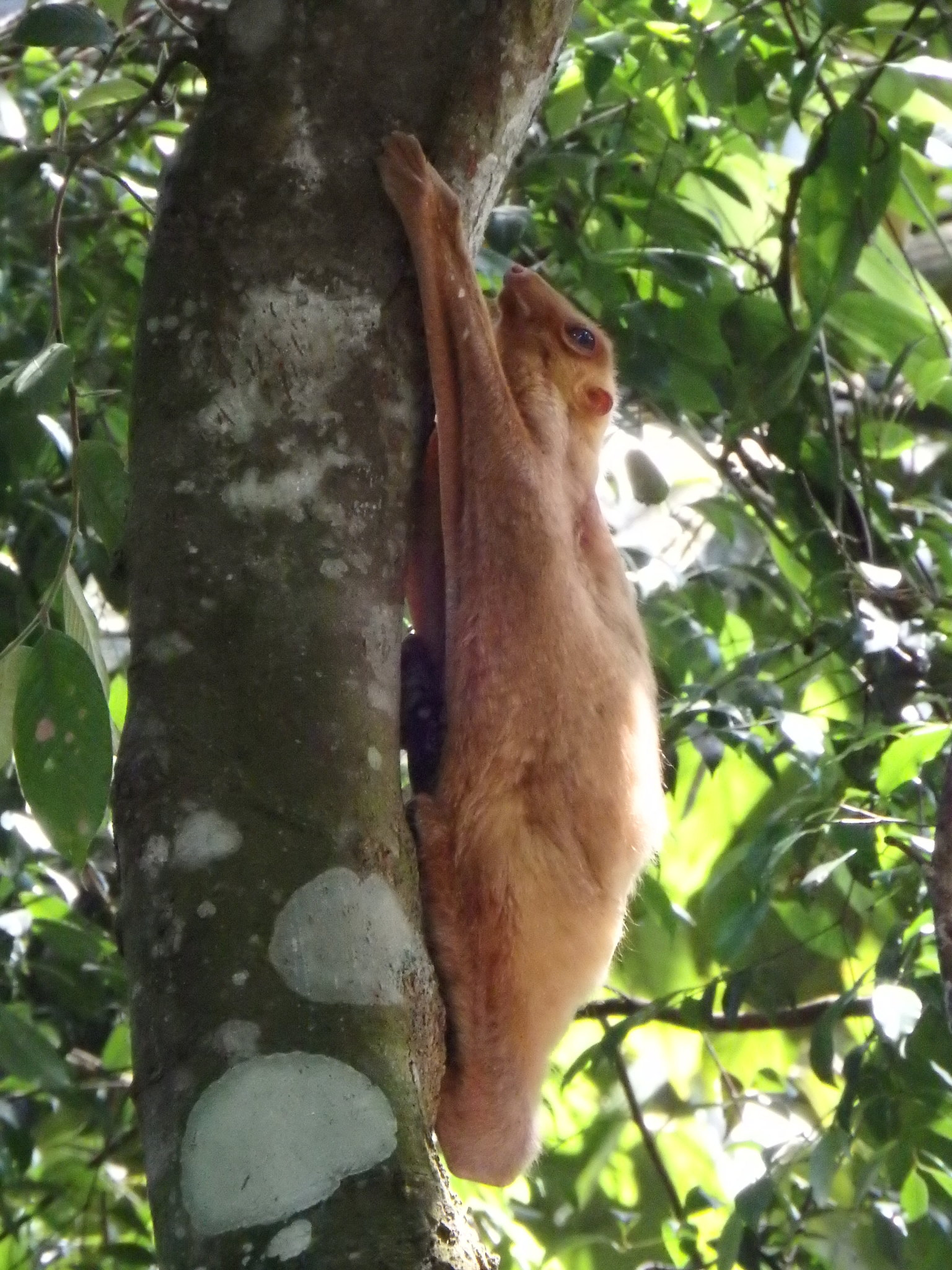
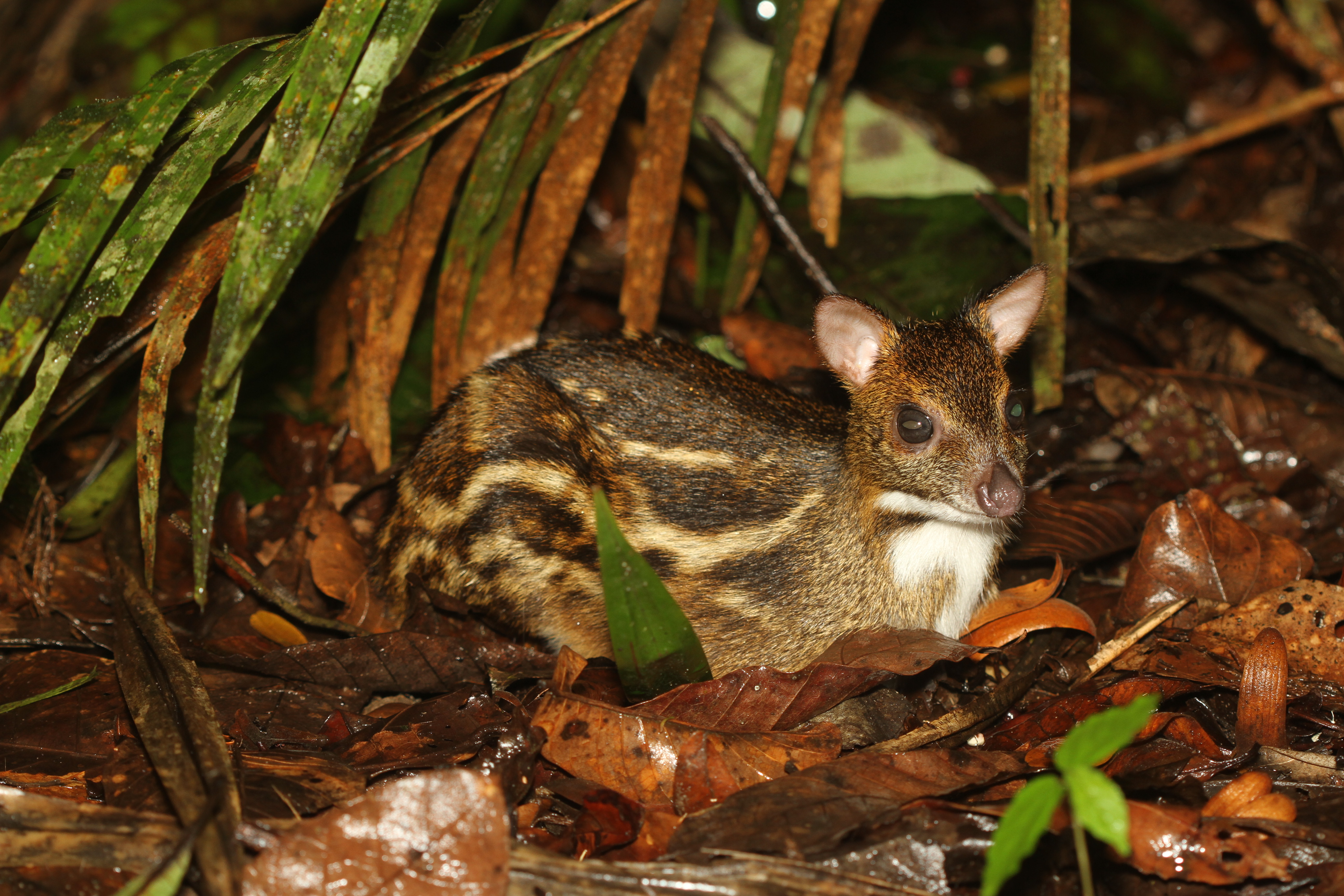
The presence of magnolias (top left), flying lemurs (top right) and early chevrotain (bottom) all point to the Krabi basin having been covered by closed tropical forest.

Krabisuchus is exclusively known from the Late Eocene sediments of the Krabi Basin of southern Thailand. Specifically, fossil remains stem from three lignite pits within the Krabi coal mine: Ban Pu Dam, Ban Bang Mark and Ban Wai Lek, all three of which are thought to be contemporary with another. The lignite pits of the Krabi Basin consist of underlying fluvial sediments deposited by an ancient river, overlain by the primary coal seam responsible for most of the fossil material and finally topped by lacustrine sediments deposited by a lake that formed towards the end of deposition. The environment present during the Eocene is generally described as swampy and the presence of freshwater is evident in part due to the presence of pond turtles and crocodilians. Another indicator for abundant freshwater is the presence of anthracotheres, which make up the single most diverse mammal group at Krabi and are often associated with more aquatic habits. However, while freshwater was clearly present, some authors such as Claude, Suteethorn and Tong have argued that it would mostly occur in the form of ponds or marshes rather than fully fledged river systems. The team specifically notes that groups such as softshell and pig-nosed turtles as well as pelumedusoids, all of which are found in the extensive river systems of the Poundaung Formation, are absent at Krabi. Instead, the lignite pits only preserve fossil remains of the small aquatic and semi-terrestrial pond turtles Mauremys and Hardella.

The terrestrial environment is generally interpreted as closed, densely vegetated subtropical to tropical forest. Evidence for this conclusion is present in various ways, including the diverse arboreal fauna that includes colugos, several different types of primates and even flying foxes. In addition to this arboreal fauna, most of the terrestrial herbivores are described as having had brachyodont dentition, meaning teeth that are best suited to deal with soft plant matter such as buds, fruits and young leaves, as would be found in a forested environment. On the flip side, animals with hypsodont dentition, which would be suited for dealing with abrasive plant matter like grasses and therefore expected from herbivores in an open environment, are not present in the Krabi Basin. Overall, a cenogram of the Krabi mammals shows a close resemblance between it and today's tropical forests of Asia, South and Central America with medium-sized animals in the range of 0.5–8 kg (1.1–17.6 lb) being the most abundant, followed by large mammals larger than 8 kg (18 lb) and only very few exceeding 100 kg (220 lb). Evidence for tropical forest also comes directly from plant fossils, namely fossil fruit of Magnolia champaca, a large evergreen tree that has persisted till today. Notably, Magnolia champaca is fully terrestrial, which furthermore suggests that the forests that once covered the Krabi Basin were likewise terrestrial in nature and did not represent mangroves.

The fauna of the Krabi Basin is largely dominated by artiodactyls, including 7 different species of anthracotheres, dichobunids, mouse deer, lophiomerycids, entelodonts, javelinas and even true pigs. Perissodactyls are less frequent but represented by eomoropid chalicotheroids and rhinos. Finally, the fauna also features colugos, miacids, nimravids and various primates including tarsiers, adapiforms and simiiforms.

=== Paleoecology ===
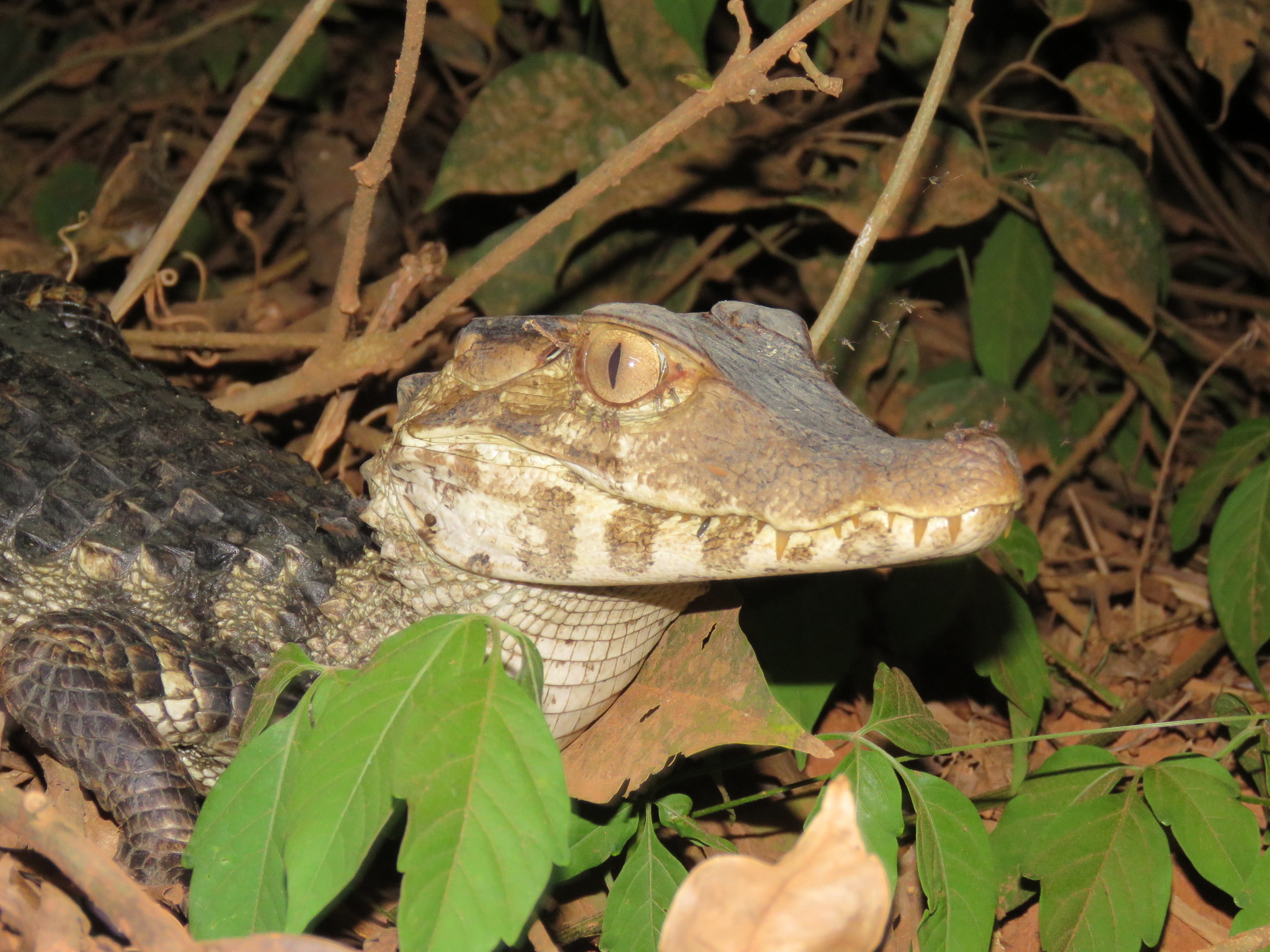
Some researchers hypothesize that Krabisuchus might have been more terrestrial than modern alligators.

Krabisuchus was not the only crocodilian to inhabit the Krabi Basin, with researchers also having identified a more slender snouted taxon that was tentatively referred to Eosuchus in some older publications. More recent work has referred this longirostrine crocodilian to the genus Maomingosuchus, with researchers noting a peculiar pattern displayed by several South Asian reptile faunas of the Eocene. Namely, the Maoming Basin of China, the Na Duong Basin of Vietnam and the Krabi Basin all share the presence of pan-geomydid turtles, a large gavialoid assigned to Maomingosuchus and one orientalosuchin per basin, seemingly endemic to their respective regions. More specifically, the crocodilian faunas consist of Maomingosuchus petrolica and Dongnanosuchus in China, Maomingosuchus acutirostris and Orientalosuchus in Vietnam and an as of yet unnamed species of Maomingosuchus and Krabisuchus in Thailand.

Given the stark difference in skull shape, both Maomingosuchus and Krabisuchus were unlikely to have been in competition with each other, with them clearly being adapted to feed on different prey items. Maomingosuchus is generally interpreted as more of a piscivore, whereas researchers have suggested that the orientalosuchins of these basins were more generalist or even turtle specialists, using the blunt teeth that are also seen in Krabisuchus to crack hard-shelled prey items. It has also been suggested that, given its altirostral skull and the more forward position of the nares, Krabisuchus might have been more terrestrial than modern alligators, a suggestion that had previously also been made in regards to the closely related Dongnanosuchus.
