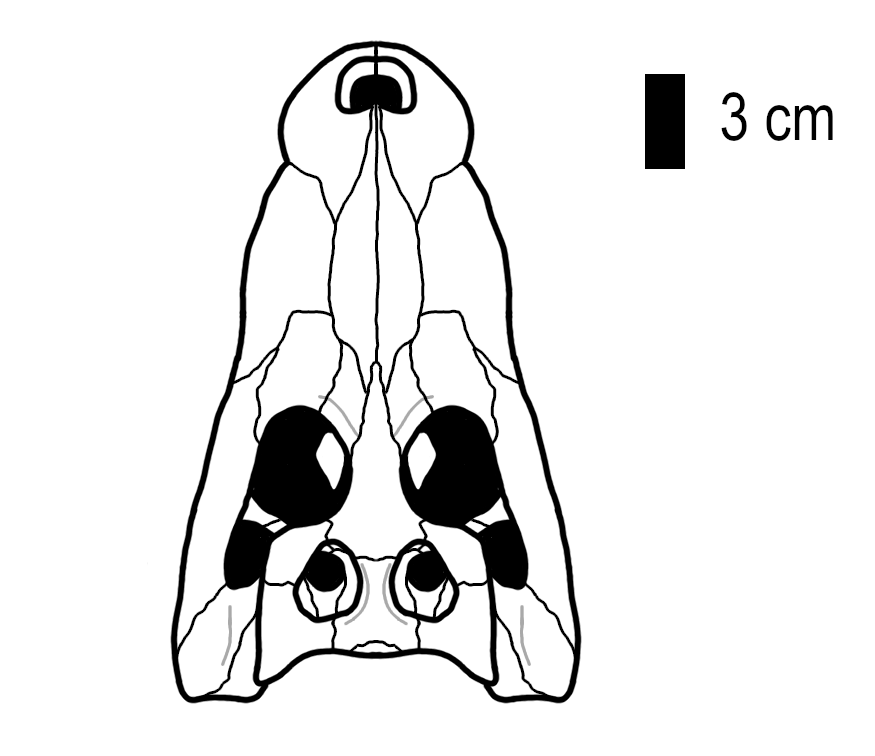

Scientific classification
- Kingdom: Animalia
- Phylum: Chordata
- Class: Reptilia
- Order: Crocodylia
- Superfamily: Crocodyloidea
- Genus: †Jiangxisuchus; Li et al., 2019

Species
- †J. nankangensis Li et al., 2019 (type)

= Jiangxisuchus =

Jiangxisuchus Temporal range: Late Cretaceous: Maastrichtian, 70.6–66 Ma

Extinct species of reptile

Jiangxisuchus is an extinct genus of crocodylian that lived during the Late Cretaceous, likely Maastrichtian, in what is now China. At the time of its description in 2019 it was proposed to be a basal member of Crocodyloidea. However, another concurrent 2019 study recovered Jiangxisuchus instead placed it in the clade Orientalosuchina, which were proposed to be early alligatoroids. The classification of Jiangxisuchus has since then remained in flux. Like other orientalosuchins, Jiangxisuchus was a small to medium-sized animal with a short, blunt snout. The genus is monotypic, containing only the species Jiangxisuchus nankangensis.

== History and naming ==
Jiangxisuchus was described in 2019 by Chun Li, Xiao-Chun Wu and Scott James Rufolo as the first crocodilian from the Cretaceous Nanxiong Formation of Nankang, China. However, subsequent studies have correlated these sediments with the Hekou Formation The type and only known specimen of the animal, consisting of the skull, parts of the lower jaw, some partial vertebrae, ribs and osteoderms, is held at the Institute of Vertebrate Paleontology and Paleoanthropology in Beijing. Though it was initially interpreted as an early-diverging crocodyloid, a study by Tobias Massonne and colleagues published that same year instead argued for it to be a member of the newly named clade Orientalosuchina.

The name Jiangxisuchus derives from the Jiangxi Province of eastern China where Nankang is located, combined with the Greek suffix -suchus which translates to crocodile. The species name is also derived from the place of origin, specifically referencing the Nankang District.

== Description ==
Like other orientalosuchins Jiangxisuchus possessed a short and blunt snout, which was initially likened to that of Stangerochampsa. Like in other orientalosuchins and modern crocodiles, a prominent notch is present where the premaxilla, which form the tip of the snout, meet the maxilla, which contains the majority of the toothrow of the upper jaw. As in modern crocodiles, this notch functions primarily to receive the enlarged fourth tooth of the dentary when the jaws are closed, separating the premaxillary from the maxillary teeth. This feature is among the characteristics that complicate the phylogenetic placement of orientalosuchins amongst crocodilians, as such a notch is generally thought to be a feature not seen in alligatoroids. This notch also contributes to the pronounced festooning of the jaw, the sinuous appearance of the dental margin created by convex and concave regions across the premaxilla and maxilla. While this festooning is not very visible when looking at the maxilla from above, a sideview reveals two bulging regions of the maxilla that peak with the fifth and eleventh tooth respectively.

The external nares are described as oval and face anterodorsally (meaning they open upwards and towards the front) with a slightly elevated rim. This opening is almost entirely surrounded by the premaxillae except for a small section at the back where the strap-like nasal bones insert themselves between the two halves to make their own contribution to the edge of the nares, even entering the opening slightly. Instead of joining one-another, each premaxilla forms a so-called premaxillary process that runs alongside the outer edges of the nasals until the level of the third maxillary tooth. The nasals stretch across the entire snout back of the nares until they meet the frontal bone, which separates them and causes them to diverge into two pointed processes that are wedged between the frontal and the rhomboid prefrontals to either side. The maxillae form the outer edges of the snout lateral to the nasals, maintaining a fairly consistent width from their contact with the premaxillae all the way back to where they contact the lacrimals. There each maxilla forms a small process that briefly slides into the space between lacrimal and nasal while on the edge of the skull they narrow significantly until they contact the jugal.

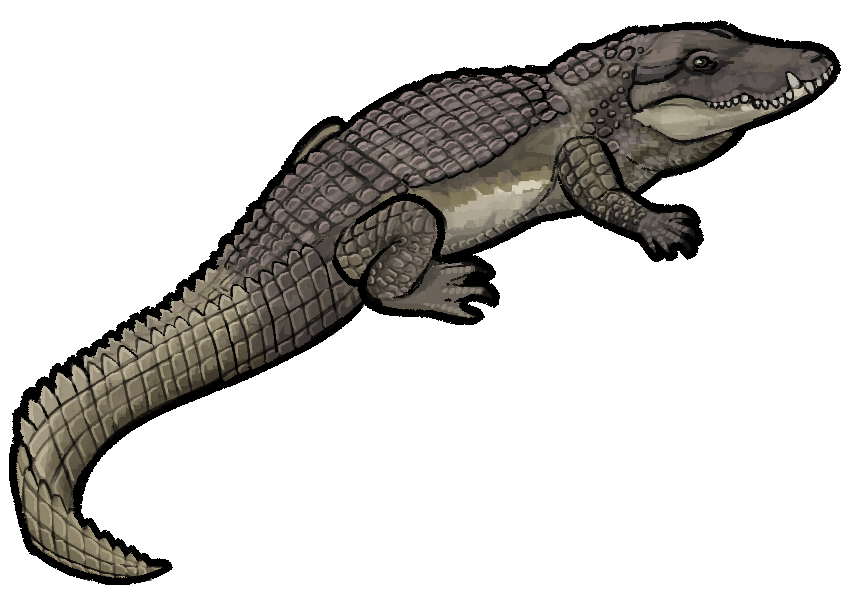
Life restoration of Jiangxisuchus nankangensis

The eyesockets of Jiangxisuchus were large, larger than any other of the skull openings, had raised rims and may have been topped by palpebrals. The orbits were separated by the singular frontal bone. This bone can broadly be divided into the pointed anterior process that splits the nasals and a posterior region that contributes to the skull table, effectively briding the regions before and behind the eyes. Overall the surface of the frontal is described as flat, meaning that the edge of the eyesockets are not raised as is seen in some other crocodilians. The skull table is a raised section of the skull located just behind the eyes and in addition to the frontal consists of the paired postorbitals, squamosals and a single parietal bone. In Jiangxisuchus the supraoccipital is also exposed on the skull table. Between these bones lie the supratemporal fossae, two openings fairly central on the structure separated by the parietal, which forms elevated rims around the openings. It is noted that between the fossae, the parietal is very narrow, much narrower than the space that separates the two eyesockets from each other. The postorbitals form the front corners of the skull table and form the upper part of the postorbital bar, a peg-like bone that separates the eyesocket and the infratemporal fenestra.

Behind the eyesockets and below the skull table lie the infratemporal fenestra, separated from the former by the postorbital bar (formed by the jugal and postorbital). The jugal forms almost the entire lower edge of the fenestra before coming into contact with the quadratojugal, which in addition to continuing horizontally also forms a so-called ascending process that forms the back edge of the infratemporal fenestra. Small parts of the fenestra are also formed by the squamosal and the quadrate, which additionally work together to form the otic recess.

Looking at the skull from below reveals that the incisive foramen, a hole close to the tip of the snout, is located noticeably further back from the tip than the external nares on the other side of the skull and entirely surrounded by the premaxillae, excluding the maxillae. Two other large openings in the underside of the cranium are the suborbital fenestrae, which are separated by the palatines which do not extend beyond the fenestrae. The pterygoid bone is located behind the palatines and contains the choana, yet another opening and divided by a septum. The pterygoid is in contact with the ectopterygoid, which forms part of the outer and posterior margin of the suborbital fenestrae and is generally described as wide. Even the narrower "waist" of the ectopterygoid is wider than the narrowest point of the palatines. It participates in the pterygoid flange but does not extend to the very end of this structure.

The mandibular symphysis, the region of the two halves of the lower jaw meet each other, is entirely formed by the dentaries to the exclusion of the splenial and described as being relatively short, ending just after the fifth tooth socket. Overall the lower jaw displays strong festooning corresponding with the upper jaw. The splenial forks at the back, contacting the surangular and angular bones as well as the mandibular fenestra.

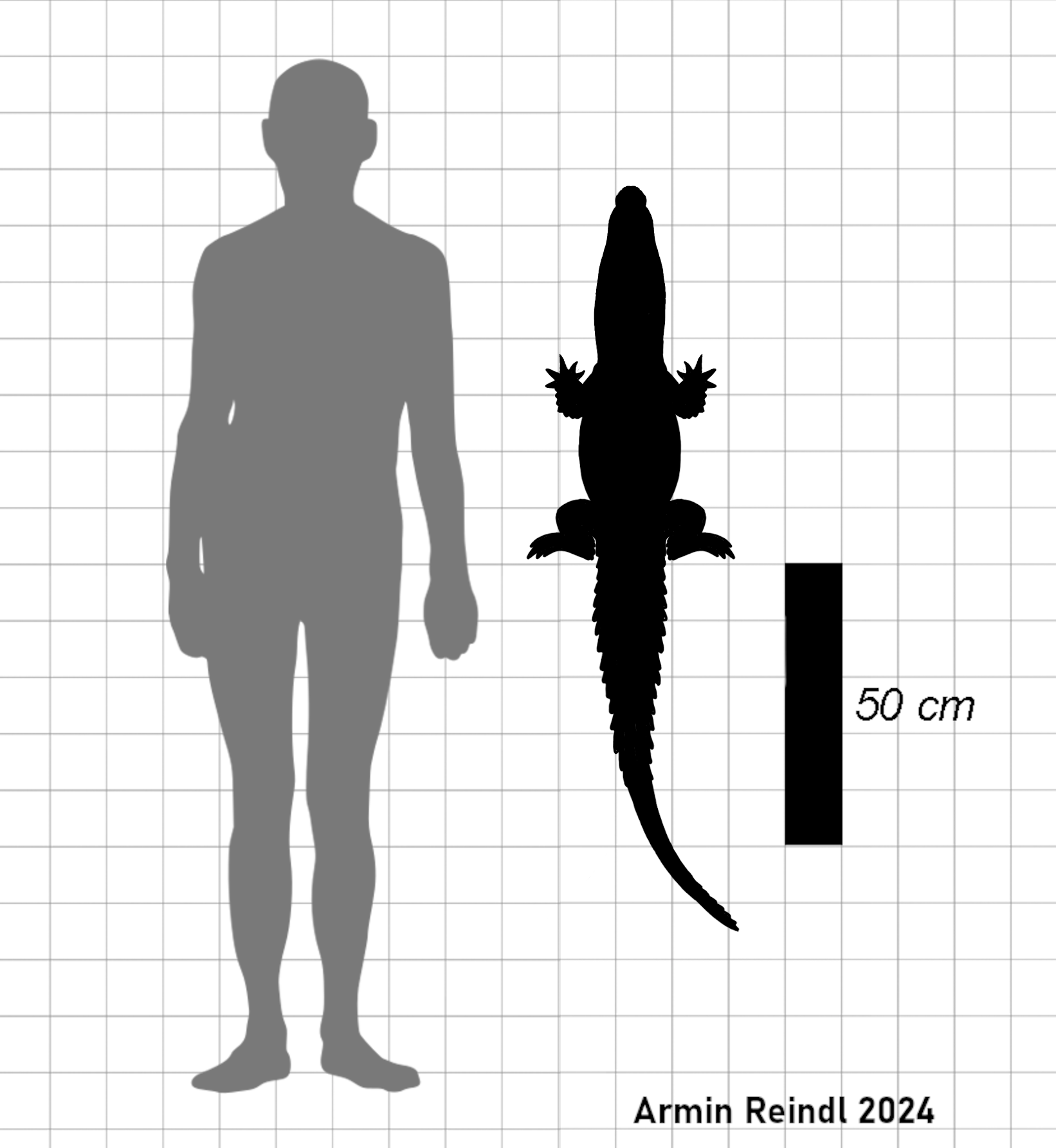
Size of Jiangxisuchus next to a human based on the holotype skull.

=== Dentition ===
The dentition of the upper jaw consisted of five premaxillary and 14 maxillary teeth, separated from each other by a diastema. Of the premaxillary teeth, the third was the largest, with the fourth and fifth being successively smaller and the first the smallest. In the maxillary toothrow, the fifth is the largest tooth, followed by the fourth and eleventh. The tooth size matches the festooning of the jaw, seeing an increase in size leading up to the fifth which marks the apex of the first convex region of the maxilla followed by a decrease leading to a concave area. A second increase of tooth size can be observed from the 8th to 11th tooth, corresponding to the second maxillary festoon. The upper jaw features two different tooth morphologies, with those in the premaxilla and the first nine maxillary teeth all being conical, unserrated and with a slight curvature to them. This changes with the tenth tooth, from which onward the teeth have a constricted base and low, bean-shaped crowns.

The lower jaw contained 19 teeth in total, with the preserved fourth tooth sharing its morphology with the fifth maxillary tooth. As is usual, the fourth dentary tooth is the largest of the lower jaw and alveolar size indicates that the twelfth would have been the second largest. There are several partial or complete bony septums that separate some of the teeth of the lower jaw and a diastema is present between the eighth and ninth dentary teeth.

Occlusion of the teeth appears to have varied across the jaw. Occlusal pits are present medial to the first two premaxillary teeth, indicating an overbite in that region, but between the seventh and eight maxillary teeth, indicating interlocking of the teeth there. The enlarged fourth dentary tooth would have slid neatly into the notch present between the premaxilla and maxilla.

=== Postcrania ===
A few postcranial elements are preserved, mostly due to being attached to the skull. These include several vertebrae including one of the tail, ribs, a radiale and a few osteoderms. Among the osteoderms is a single eliptical piece that lacks a crest. This would suggest that the osteoderm would in life have been part of the appendicular armor, meaning Jiangxisuchus had armored limbs.

=== Size ===
Jiangxisuchus is described as small to medium sized, something that appears to have been a trend among orientalosuchins.

== Phylogeny ==
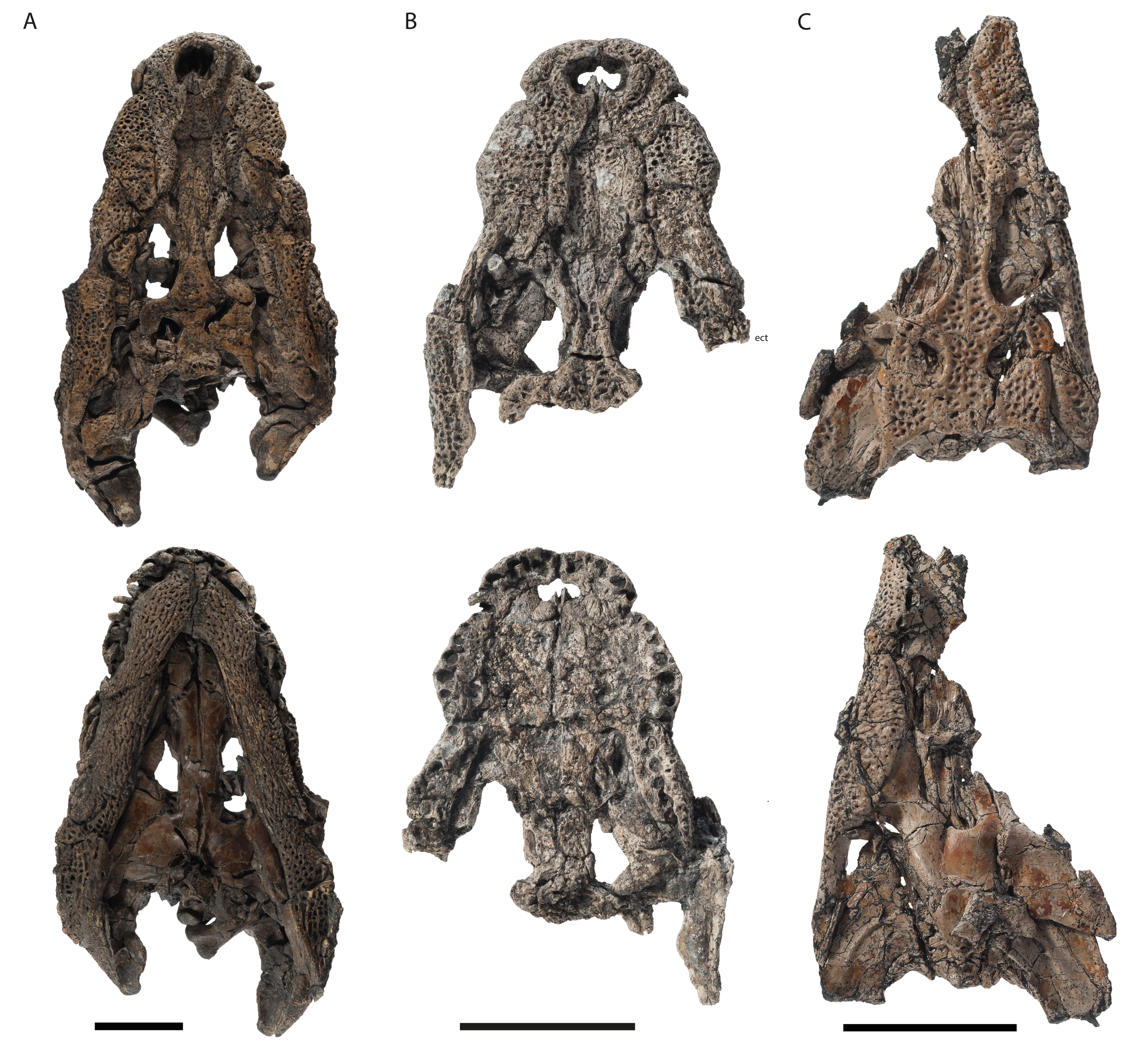
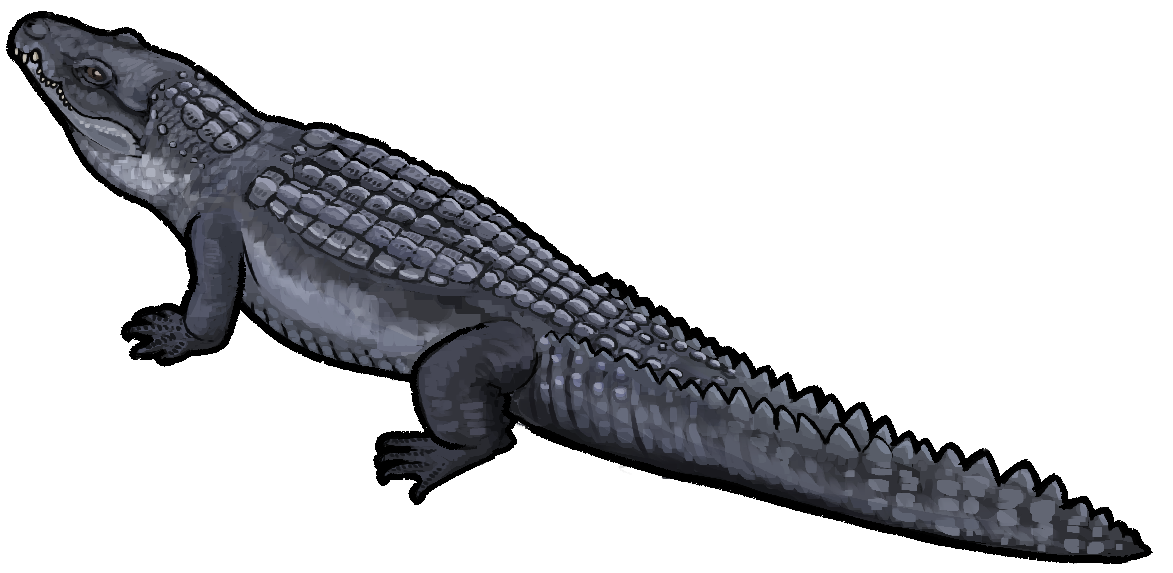
Jiangxisuchus is by some recovered as part of the clade Orientalosuchina, though the precise placement of this clade may vary.

The classification of Jiangxisuchus has changed repeatedly since its description, with studies disagreeing over whether or not Jiangxisuchus is a crocodyloid or an alligatoroid and its precise relationship with orientalosuchins. The type description in 2019 grouped alligatoroids and crocodyloids (including tomistomines, which are now more commonly regarded as gavialoids) in the clade Brevirostres and found Jiangxisuchus in a basal position of the crocodyloid branch. In this position, the animal was furthermore recovered as the sister taxon to the early Paleocene Eoalligator chunyii. These results do reflect the beginnings of Orientalosuchina being recognized as a phylogenetic grouping, as they not only reject Eoalligator being synonymized with Asiatosuchus nanlingensis (as proposed by Yan-Yin Wang and colleagues in 2016) but further establish ties between it and Jiangxisuchus.

Orientalosuchina would come to be recognized later that same year with the description of Orientalosuchus by Tobias Massonne and colleagues. This study not only recognized the link between Eoalligator and Jiangxisuchus as was established by Li et al. but furthermore found them to clade with the then newly named Orientalosuchus, Protoalligator (named three years prior by Wang et al.) and Krabisuchus from Thailand. This grouping was at first only partially resolved, but clarified across future studies with the description of additional orientalosuchins such as Dongnanosuchus and Eurycephalosuchus. By the description of the latter relationships had shifted slightly, with Krabisuchus and Protoalligator in basal positions, Orientalosuchus, Dongnanosuchus and Eurycephalosuchus in a polytomy and finally Jiangxisuchus and Eoalligator still as sister taxa. A notable difference between the initial interpretation of Li and colleagues and the phylogenetic trees that recover a monophyletic Orientalosuchina concerns the wider relations of the group among crocodilians. While the Eoalligator-Jiangxisuchus relationship is consistently retained, these later studies generally find members of Orientalosuchina to be basal alligatoroids, not crocodyloids as was hypothesized by Li and colleagues. Both the results of Li et al. 2019 as well as those of Wu et al. 2022 are shown below.

- Crocodilia
  - Gavialoidea
  - - †Borealosuchus
    - - †Planocraniidae
      - Brevirostres
        - Alligatoroidea
        - Crocodyloidea
          - †"Asiatosuchus" germanicus
          - - †Albertosuchus
            - - †Prodiplocynodon
              - - - †Eoalligator
                  - †Jiangxisuchus
                - - - †Crocodylus depressifrons
                    - †Crocodylus affinis
                    - †Asiatosuchus grangeri
                  - - - †Brachyuranochampsa
                      - †Crocodylus acer
                    - - Tomistominae
                      - Crocodylinae

- - Alligatoroidea
    - †Leidyosuchus
    - - †Deinosuchus
      - †Diplocynodon
      - Globidonta
        - †Orientalosuchina
          - †Krabisuchus siamogallicus
          - - †Protoalligator huiningensis
            - - †Orientalosuchus naduongenis
              - †Dongnanosuchus hsui
              - †Eurycephalosuchus gannanensis
              - - †Jiangxisuchus nankangensis
                - †Eoalligator chunyii
        - Alligatoridae

However while multiple papers have recovered Jiangxisuchus as a member of a monophyletic Orientalosuchina at the base of alligatoroidea, this view is not uncontested. In addition to the type description, multiple subsequent studies have also come out in favour of Jiangxisuchus being an early crocodyloid and possibly entirely unrelated to Orientalosuchina. One example for this a study published by Jonathan P. Rio and Phillip D. Manion in 2021, in which Jiangxisuchus is an early branching crocodyloid diverging just before the split between Crocodylidae and Mekosuchinae. The two authors do however note that their study did not extensively sample other reported members of Orientalosuchina. The same does not apply to the 2024 osteology of Crocodylus palaeindicus, penned by Nils Chabrol and colleagues. In this work, orientalosuchines were given much more consideration and in fact did form a monophyletic group, however to the exclusion of Jiangxisuchus. Regardless of the precise plament of Orientalosuchina (once as basal longirostrans and once as early alligatoroids), Jiangxisuchus was recovered as being closer to Longirostres (crocodiles and gharials) than alligatoroids in both instances.

- - †Planocraniidae
  - - †Asiatosuchus germanicus
    - - - †Asiatosuchus depressifrons
        - †Crocodylus affinis
      - - †Qianshanosuchus
        - - †Jiangxisuchus
          - - †Quinkana
            - - †Australosuchus
              - - †Orientalosuchina
                - - Gavialoidea
                  - Crocodyloidea

- - - - - †Asiatosuchus germanicus
        - †Crocodylus affinis
      - - †Asiatosuchus depressifrons
        - †Qianshanosuchus
    - - †Planocraniidae
      - - †Orientalosuchina
        - other alligatoroids
  - - †Australosuchus
    - - †Jiangxisuchus
      - - †Prodiplocynodon
        - - Gavialoidea
          - Crocodyloidea

An intermediate between the crocodyloid interpretation and the Orientalosuchina classification has been recovered by Jorgo Ristevski and colleagues in 2023, though it simultaneously added yet another competing topology into the mix. In this study, two phylogenetic trees found orientalosuchins to be a group within the Australian clade Mekosuchinae, located between the large-bodied representatives of the group such as Baru and Paludirex and the smaller dwarf forms like Mekosuchus. These results bear close internal resemblance to the topology also seen in Wu et al. 2022, with Krabisuchus at the base and Jiangxisuchus once again assuming its position as the sister taxon to Eoalligator. The main divergence regard the positions of Dongnanosuchus, which was found closer to the small-bodied mekosuchines, and the absence of Protoalligator (which was recovered either in a basal crocodilian polytomy or outside of Crocodylia entirely). So while this matches the overall idea of Orientalosuchina as a group of Cretaceous to early Paleogene crocodilians as established by Massonne and colleagues, it simultaneously does not find the alligatoroid affinities and instead places them within a group that is closer to Longirostres.

However this view is likewise not without caveats and the support for Orientalosuchina being placed within Mekosuchinae remains weak. As highlighted in the same study, few elements truly unite the two groups and many of them are either present in only some of the members of Orientalosuchina and Mekosuchinae respectively or not limited to these groups and in fact also seen in a variety of other crocodilians.

- Crocodilia
  - Alligatoroidea
  - - †Planocraniidae
    - - - †Prodiplocynodon
        - - - †"Crocodylus" affinis
            - †"Crocodylus" depressifrons
          - - †"Crocodylus" acer
            - †Brachyuranochampsa
          - Longirostres
            - Gavialoidea
            - Crocodyloidea
      - - †Asiatosuchus germanicus
        - Mekosuchinae
          - - †Kalthifrons
            - - - †Quinkana meboldi
                - - †Quinkana fortirostrum
                  - †Quinkana timara
              - - - †Paludirex gracilis
                  - †Paludirex vincenti
                - - †Baru wickeni
                  - †Baru darrowi
          - - Orientalosuchina
              - †Krabisuchus
              - - †Orientalosuchus
                - - †Jiangxisuchus
                  - †Eoalligator
            - - †Dongnanosuchus
              - - †"Baru" huberi
                - - †Volia
                  - †Trilophosuchus
                  - - †Mekosuchus sanderi
                    - †Mekosuchus whitehunterensis
                    - †Mekosuchus inexpectatus

== Paleobiology ==
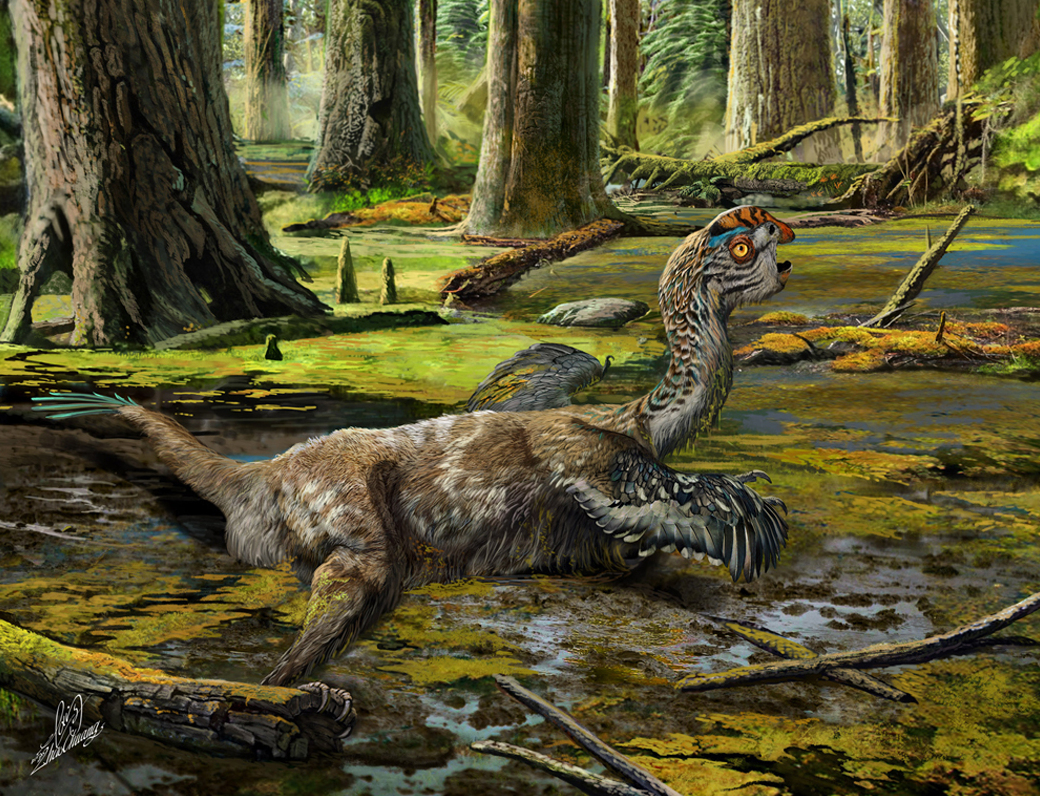
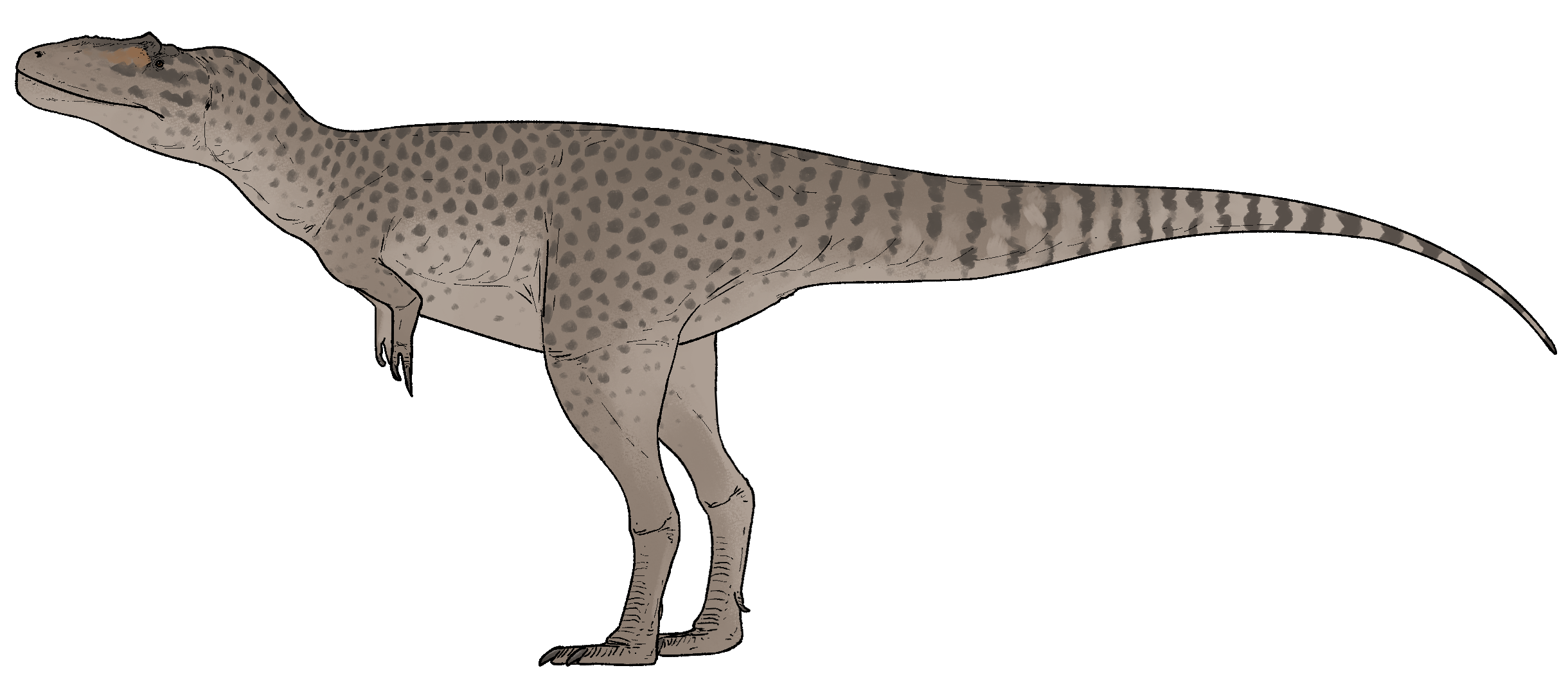
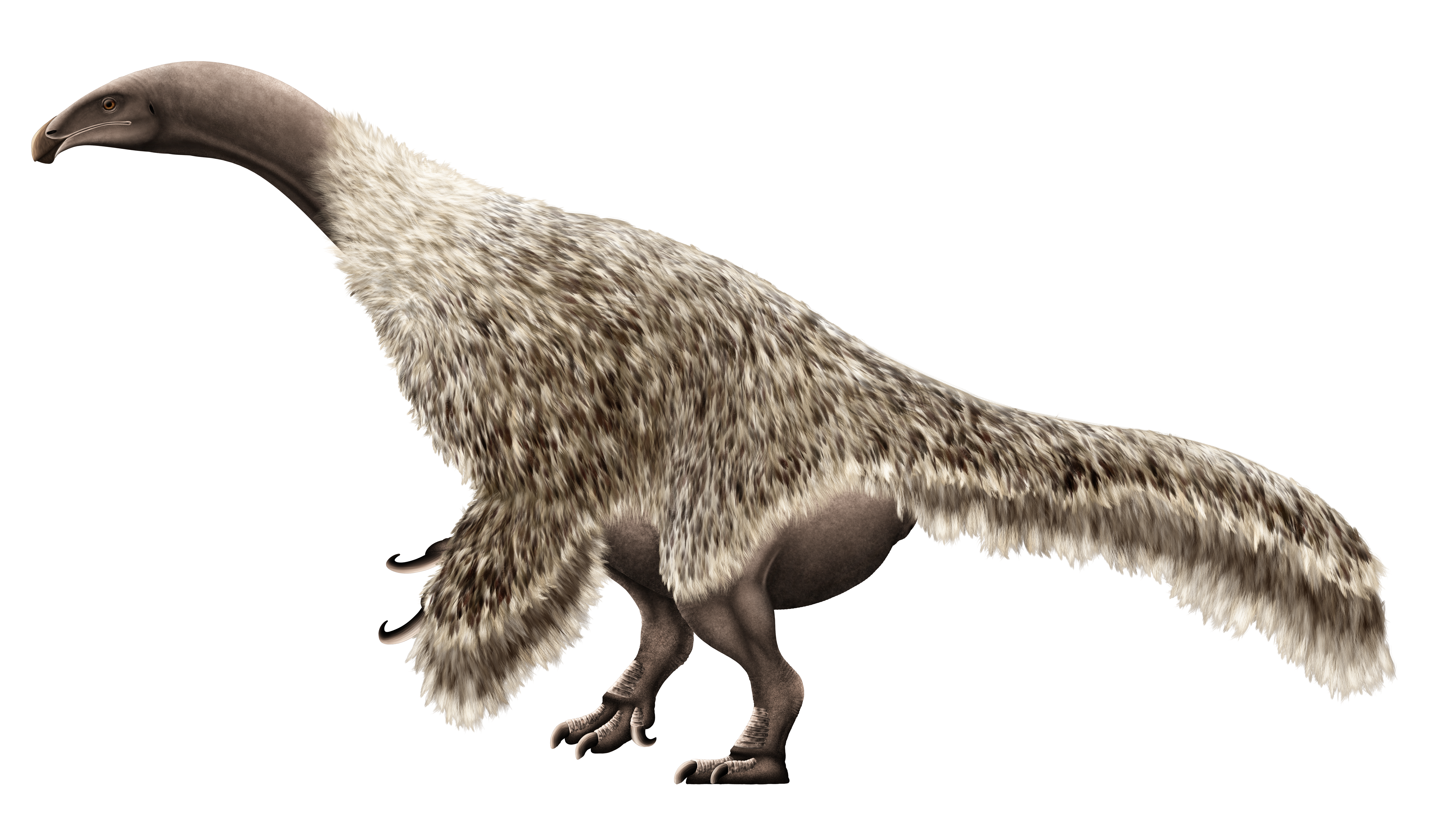
Some fauna contemporary with Jiangxisuchus.

The Nanxiong Formation is well known for its preservation of Late Cretaceous dinosaurs, but the statigraphy of the region is poorly understood with several differing interpretations. Li and colleagues use the name Nanxiong Formation for sediments of the Ganzhou basin, which other authors refer to as the Guifeng Group, itself divided into the Hekou, Tangbian and Lianhe Formation. Studies using the latter terminology have assigned fossil remains traditionally stated to be from the Nanxiong Formation of Ganzhou as stemming from the Hekou Formation, which would include those of Jiangxisuchus. The age of the Hekou Formation is typically accepted to be Maastrichtian, though some studies have considered a Coniacian to Santonian age as well. The Hekou Formation may have been roughly contemporary with the Dafeng Formation of the Nanxiong Group (located in the nearby Nanxiong Basin).

The Hekou Formation is marked by the influence of rivers and is thought to have been deposited in a subhumid environment in the proximal parts of an alluvial fan. Streams would have spread out beyond the fan, stretching across a floodplain.

Though theropods are abundant in numbers, they are comparably low in clade-diversity. Two tyrannosaurs have been described from the Nanxiong Formation, the small but deep-snouted Asiatyrannus and the long-snouted Qianzhousaurus, which at twice the size of the former likely filled the nische of apex predator. Most of the remaining theropod fauna consists of oviraptorosaurs, with more than seven species having been reported, including Banji, Tongtianlong, Ganzhousaurus, Jiangxisaurus, Huanansaurus, Nankangia and Corythoraptor, though given the poor understanding of the formations stratigraphy they may not have necessarily coexisted. The native herbivore fauna would have included the sauropods Gannansaurus and Jiangxititan as well as hadrosaurs. The small fauna featured squamates like Conicodontosaurus, Chianghsia and Tianyusaurus, the turtles Jiangxichelys and Nanhsiungchelys as well as the mammal Erythrobaatar. Two other crocodilians have been recovered from the sediments of the Hekou Formation, though they may not have necessarily coexisted with each other. One of them was a close relative of Jiangxisuchus, the very short-snouted orientalosuchin Eurycephalosuchus, while the other represents an indetermined member of Brevirostres. Given that the latter is exclusively known from postcranial remains, it is not impossible that it represents another specimen of Jiangxisuchus.
