= "Crocodylus" megarhinus =

"Crocodylus" megarhinus Temporal range: Early Oligocene, 33.9–28.1 Ma

Scientific classification
- Kingdom: Animalia
- Phylum: Chordata
- Class: Reptilia
- Order: Crocodylia
- Family: incertae sedis
- Species: †"Crocodylus" megarhinus Andrews, 1905

Binomial name
- †"Crocodylus" megarhinus

Synonyms
- Crocodylus articeps Andrews, 1906

Species of reptile (fossil)

"Crocodylus" megarhinus is an extinct species of crocodile from the Eocene of Egypt. A partial skull was found by British paleontologist Charles William Andrews in the Fayum Depression. Andrews named Crocodylus megarhinus in 1905 on the basis of the holotype skull. A complete skull was also uncovered from Egypt in 1907 but was not recognized as "C." megarhinus until 1927.

"C." megarhinus shares many features with living crocodiles like the Nile crocodile (C. niloticus), including a robust triangular skull that is shorter than most other crocodiles. Similarities are also seen in the teeth of the two species. Like living crocodiles, "C." megarhinus has several constricted areas along the upper jaw that provide spaces for the teeth of the lower jaw when the mouth is closed. The proportions of "C." megarhinus and C. niloticus are so similar that American paleontologist Charles C. Mook considered it "very probable that C. megarhinus is a direct ancestor of C. niloticus."

A second Fayum crocodilian, "Crocodylus" articeps, was named alongside "C." megarhinus. Andrews distinguished "C." articeps from "C." megarhinus on the basis of its narrower snout, which is more similar to the slender-snouted crocodile than the Nile crocodile. "C." articeps has recently been synonymized with "C." megarhinus, and may represent a less mature form in the species' population.

Although it has traditionally been described as a species of Crocodylus, "C." megarhinus has been placed outside the genus in many recent phylogenetic analyses. A new genus has not yet been erected for the species. "C." megarhinus is usually found to be a basal crocodyline outside the genus but still more closely related to it than the false gharial or mekosuchines. Below is a cladogram modified from Puértolas et al. (2011) showing its phylogenetic placement among crocodiles:

- Crocodyloidea
  - Prodiplocynodon
  - Asiatosuchus
  - - Arenysuchus
    - "Crocodylus" affinis
    - - Brachyuranochampsa
      - "Crocodylus" acer
      - Crocodylidae
        - Tomistominae
        - - Mekosuchinae
          - - "Crocodylus" megarhinus
            - - Crocodylus
              - - Voay
                - Osteolaemus

A 2017 paper by Wu et al. (2017) recovers "Crocodylus" megarhinus as a relative of mekosuchines.

A 2018 tip dating study by Lee & Yates simultaneously using morphological, molecular (DNA sequencing), and stratigraphic (fossil age) data established the inter-relationships within Crocodylia, which was expanded upon in 2021 by Hekkala et al. using paleogenomics by extracting DNA from the extinct Voay.

The below cladogram shows the results of the latest study, and how "C." megarhinus may be outside of Crocodylidae, as a basal member of Crocodyloidea (and perhaps the sole additional taxon beyond Crocodylidae):

- Crocodylia (crown group)
  - Alligatoroidea (stem group)
    - extinct basal Alligatoroids†
    - Alligatoridae (crown group)
      - Caimaninae
        - - Caiman
          - Melanosuchus
        - Paleosuchus
      - Alligatorinae
        Alligator
  - Longirostres (crown group)
    - Crocodyloidea (stem group)
      - "Crocodylus" megarhinus†
      - Crocodylidae (crown group)
        - Crocodylus
        - - Mecistops
          - Osteolaemus
    - Gavialoidea (stem group)
      - extinct basal Gavialoids†
      - Gavialidae (crown group)
        - Gavialis
        - Tomistoma
