= Prodiplocynodon =

Prodiplocynodon Temporal range: Late Cretaceous, 70–66 Ma

Scientific classification
- Domain: Eukaryota
- Kingdom: Animalia
- Phylum: Chordata
- Class: Reptilia
- Clade: Archosauria
- Order: Crocodilia
- Superfamily: Crocodyloidea
- Genus: †Prodiplocynodon; Mook, 1941

Type species
- †Prodiplocynodon langi Mook, 1941

Extinct genus of reptiles

Prodiplocynodon is an extinct genus of basal crocodyloid crocodylian. It is one of the only crocodyloids known from the Cretaceous and existed during the Maastrichtian stage. The only species of Prodiplocynodon is the type species P. langi from the Lance Formation of Wyoming, known only from a single holotype skull lacking the lower jaw.

The skull was collected by the American Museum Expedition of 1892 from exposures near the Cheyenne River in Niobrara County. It was described by Charles C. Mook of the American Museum of Natural History in 1941. The generic name means "before Diplocynodon" because Mook saw close similarities between the holotype skull and that of the alligatoroid Diplocynodon from the Eocene of Europe.

== Description ==
Most of the cranial sutures that outline individual bones of the skull are not visible in the holotype, and are often obscured by cracks. However, the overall shape of Prodiplocynodon is similar to that of basal alligatoroids. Many of the features seen in Prodiplocynodon are common among eusuchians. The skull is short and triangular, being around 50 centimetres (20 in) in length. The orbits, or eye sockets, are quite large and subtriangular. The teeth are short and somewhat sharp, and in comparison to modern crocodiles show little variation. The orbits face directly upwards, but this may have been the result of slight compression in the holotype skull. The external nasal aperture, the opening for the nostrils, is very large. There is a constriction at the point of contact between the premaxilla and maxilla which would have been an area of reception for a large mandibular tooth. In Prodiplocynodon, the constriction is not deep, being intermediate between that of Alligator and Crocodylus.

== Classification ==
Mook suggested that Prodiplocynodon may be ancestral to alligatorids and crocodylids because it possessed features of both families. However, Mook also noted that some of the features observed in Prodiplocynodon that are also found in modern crocodylians may be the result of evolutionary convergence, and thus Prodiplocynodon was also proposed to be an alligatorine.

=== Phylogeny ===
Prodiplocynodon was not included in a phylogenetic study until 1996. In that study, Prodiplocynodon was excluded from the Alligatorinae because it lacked all seven of the unequivocal synapomorphies that were proposed for the clade. According to the 1996 study, characters that exclude Prodiplocynodon from Alligatorinae include the presence of a distinct lateral constriction between the premaxilla and maxilla, a contact between the nasal and lacrimal, and the lack of posterior massive crushing teeth. The 1996 analysis considered Prodiplocynodon to be the sister taxon to the Alligatorinae rather than the Crocodylinae because in Prodiplocynodon, the jugal-lacrimal suture is much shorter than the ventral border of the orbit. However, the authors of the study mentioned that this character is also seen in some derived crocodylines, and is lost in some ingroups of Alligatorinae.

Successive phylogenetic studies have placed Prodiplocynodon as a basal member of Crocodyloidea along with Asiatosuchus, as shown in the cladogram below:

- Crocodyloidea
  - Prodiplocynodon langi
  - Asiatosuchus germanicus
  - - Crocodylus affinis
    - - Dormaal crocodyloid
      - - Crocodylus acer
        - Brachyuranochampsa eversolei
        - Crocodylidae
          - Tomistominae*
          - Crocodylinae
  *Note: Tomistominae, which includes the extant False Gharial, is sometimes considered to be a gavialoid lineage on the basis of genetic evidence.

A 2018 tip dating study by Lee & Yates simultaneously using morphological, molecular (DNA sequencing), and stratigraphic (fossil age) data established the inter-relationships within Crocodilia, which was expanded upon in 2021 by Hekkala et al. using paleogenomics by extracting DNA from the extinct Voay.

The below cladogram shows the results of the latest studies, which placed Prodiplocynodon outside of Crocodyloidea, as more basal than Longirostres (the combined group of crocodiles and gavialids).

- Crocodylia
  - Alligatoroidea
  - - Prodiplocynodon†
    - - Asiatosuchus†
      - - "Crocodylus" affinis†
        - - "Crocodylus" depressifrons†
          - - - "Crocodylus" acer†
              - Brachyuranochampsa†
            - - Mekosuchinae†
              - Longirostres
                - Crocodyloidea
                  - "Crocodylus" megarhinus†
                  - Crocodylidae
                - Gavialoidea
                  - extinct basal Gavialoids†
                  - Gavialidae
                    - Gavialis
                    - Tomistoma
