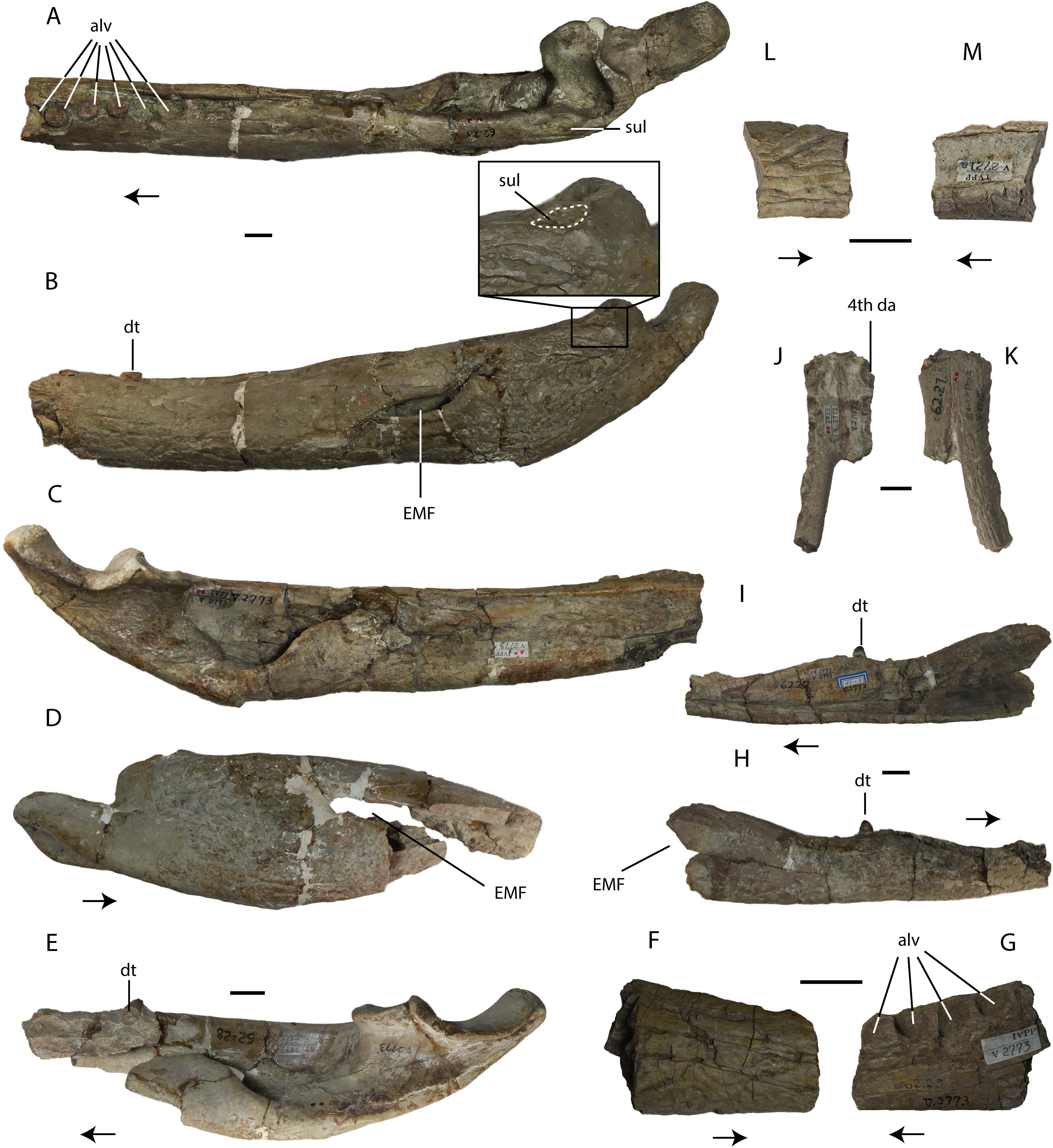
- A. nanlingensis specimens

Scientific classification
- Kingdom: Animalia
- Phylum: Chordata
- Class: Reptilia
- Order: Crocodylia
- Superfamily: Crocodyloidea
- Genus: †Asiatosuchus; Mook, 1940

Type species
- †Asiatosuchus grangeri Mook, 1940

Species
- †A. grangeri Mook, 1940 (type); †"A." germanicus Berg, 1966; †"A." depressifrons (Blainville, 1855); †"A." nanlingensis Young, 1964; †"A." oenotriensis Narváez et al., 2024; †A. volgensis Efimov & Yarkov, 1993

= Asiatosuchus =

Asiatosuchus Temporal range: Paleocene - Eocene, 61.6–41.2 Ma

Extinct genus of reptiles

Asiatosuchus is an extinct genus of crocodyloid crocodilians that lived in Eurasia during the Paleogene. Many Paleogene crocodilians from Europe and Asia have been attributed to Asiatosuchus since the genus was named in 1940. These species have a generalized crocodilian morphology typified by flat, triangular skulls. The feature that traditionally united these species under the genus Asiatosuchus is a broad connection or symphysis between the two halves of the lower jaw. Recent studies of the evolutionary relationships of early crocodilians along with closer examinations of the morphology of fossil specimens suggest that only the first named species of Asiatosuchus, A. grangeri from the Eocene of Mongolia, belongs in the genus. Most species are now regarded as nomina dubia or "dubious names", meaning that their type specimens lack the unique anatomical features necessary to justify their classification as distinct species. Other species such as "A." germanicus and "A." depressifrons are still considered valid species, but they do not form an evolutionary grouping with A. grangeri that would warrant them being placed together in the genus Asiatosuchus.

== Description ==
Like most other Paleogene crocodyloids, Asiatosuchus has a generalized crocodilian skull that is triangular in shape when viewed from above. Asiatosuchus species have teeth in the upper jaw that completely overlap the teeth in the lower jaw, giving them overbites. An overbite is a primitive feature among crocodyloids because modern crocodiles have teeth in the upper and lower jaws that interlock with each other with little overlap. Asiatosuchus can be distinguished from other early crocodyloids by its extended mandibular symphysis, the region where the two halves of the lower jaws connect. In many crocodyloids this joint is formed from two pairs of bones, the dentary bones and the splenial bones, but in Asiatosuchus it is only formed by the dentary bones. Based on largely complete skeletons of "A." germanicus and "A." depressifrons, Asiatosuchus may have grown up to 4 metres (13 ft) long.

== Species ==
=== A. grangeri ===
A. grangeri, the type species of Asiatosuchus, was named by paleontologist Charles Mook in 1940. It was named on the basis of a lower jaw and pieces of a skull from the Irdin Manha Formation of Inner Mongolia, China, which dates back to the Middle Eocene. These fossils were discovered by the American Museum of Natural History's Central Asiatic Expedition of 1930 near Erenhot. Mook named Asiatosuchus grangeri after Walter W. Granger, a vertebrate paleontologist with the American Museum of Natural History and a member of the expedition. Mook thought that Asiatosuchus grangeri was closely related to species of Crocodylus (modern crocodiles) but different in having 17 teeth in each half of the lower jaw and a splenial bone that does not form part of the mandibular symphysis.

=== "A." germanicus ===
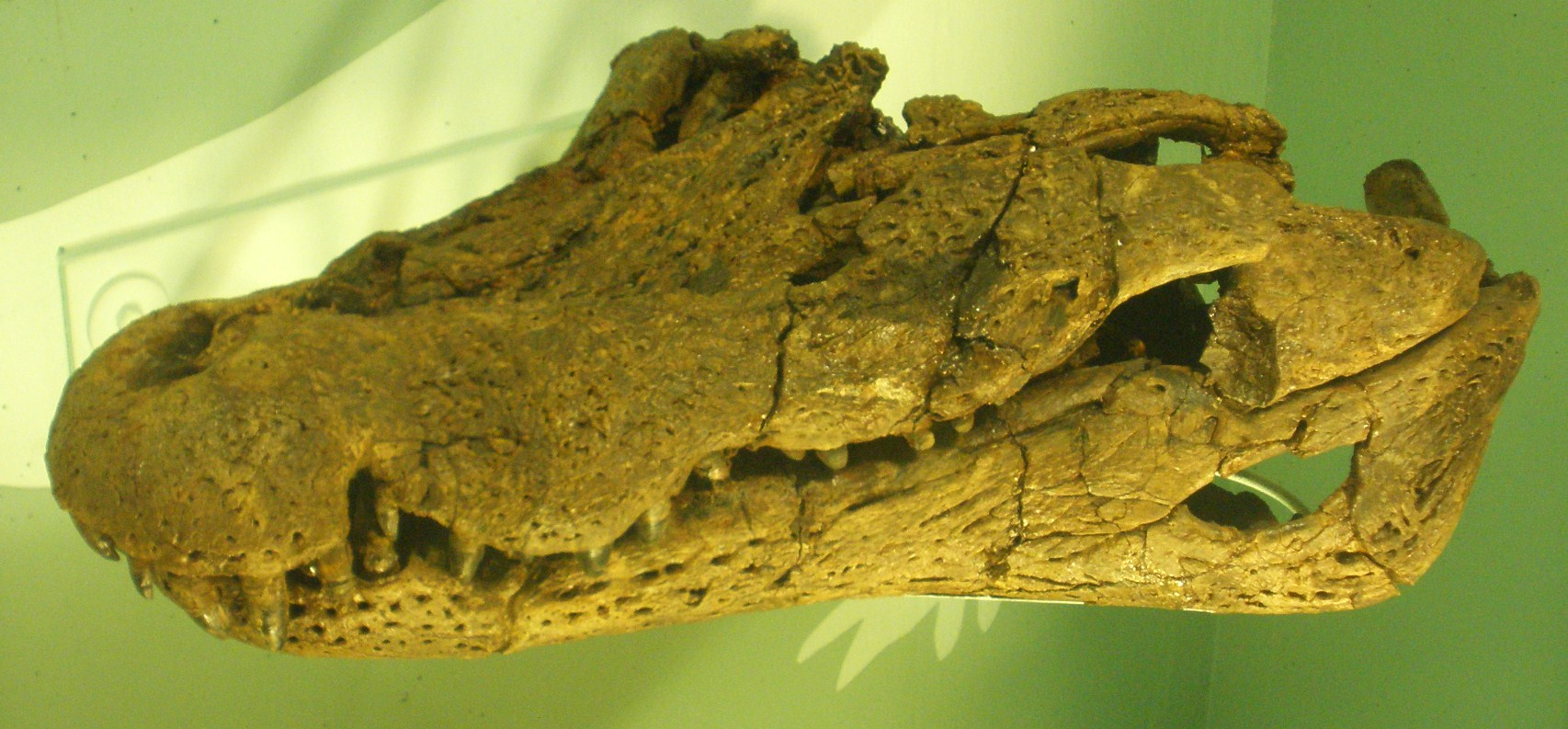
"Asiatosuchus" germanicus skull

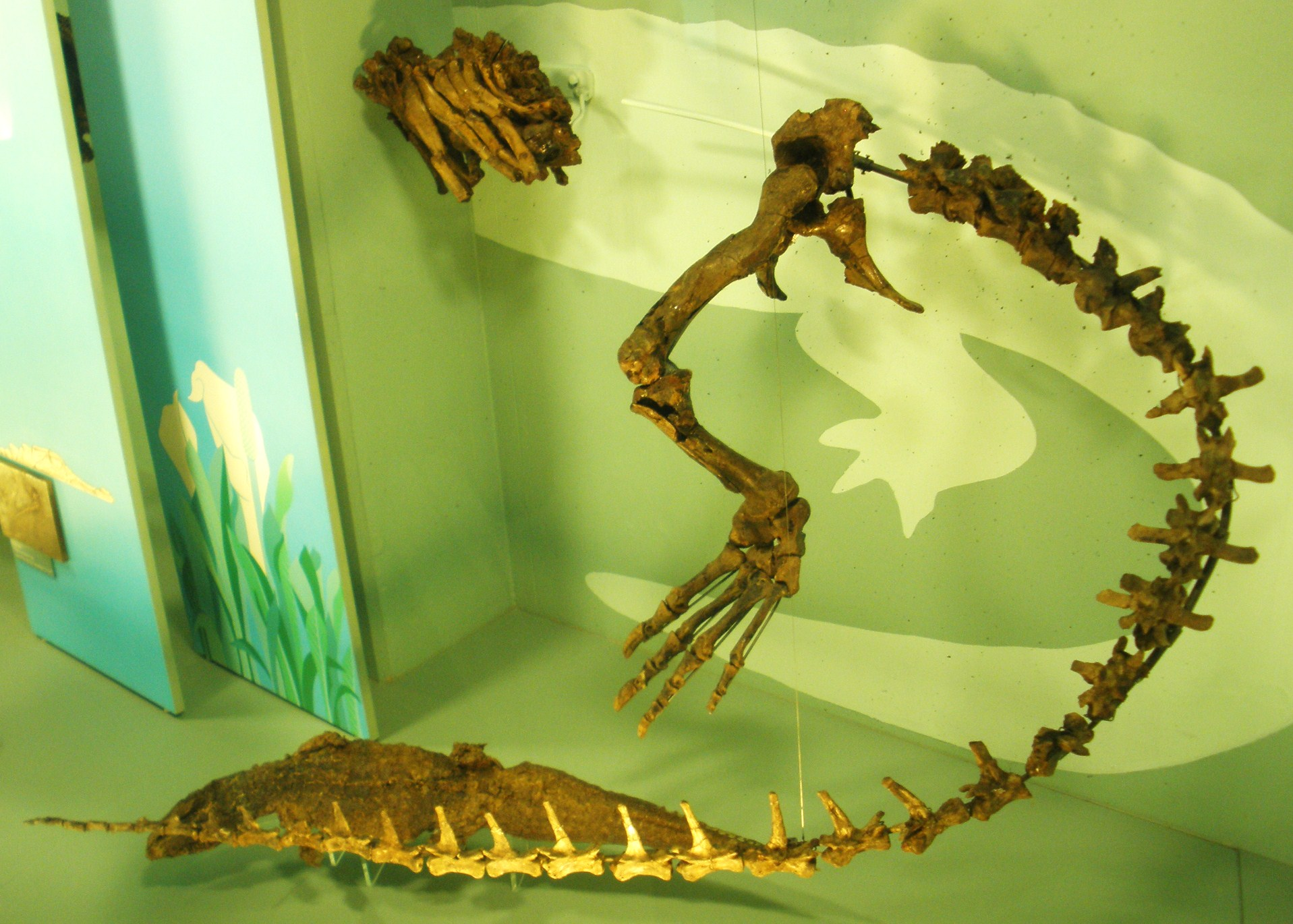
"A." germanicus hind leg and tail

Well-preserved remains of a crocodyloid were first described from Germany and France in 1966 and placed in a new species of Asiatosuchus, A. germanicus. The German remains came from the Messel Pit quarry, a fossil site that has preserved many forms of life that inhabited a series of anoxic lakes and surrounding subtropical forests during the Eocene. Of all the species that have been assigned to Asiatosuchus, "A." germanicus is known from the most complete material. A.germanicus is estimated at 6.5 meters (21.5 ft) in length.

=== "A." depressifrons ===
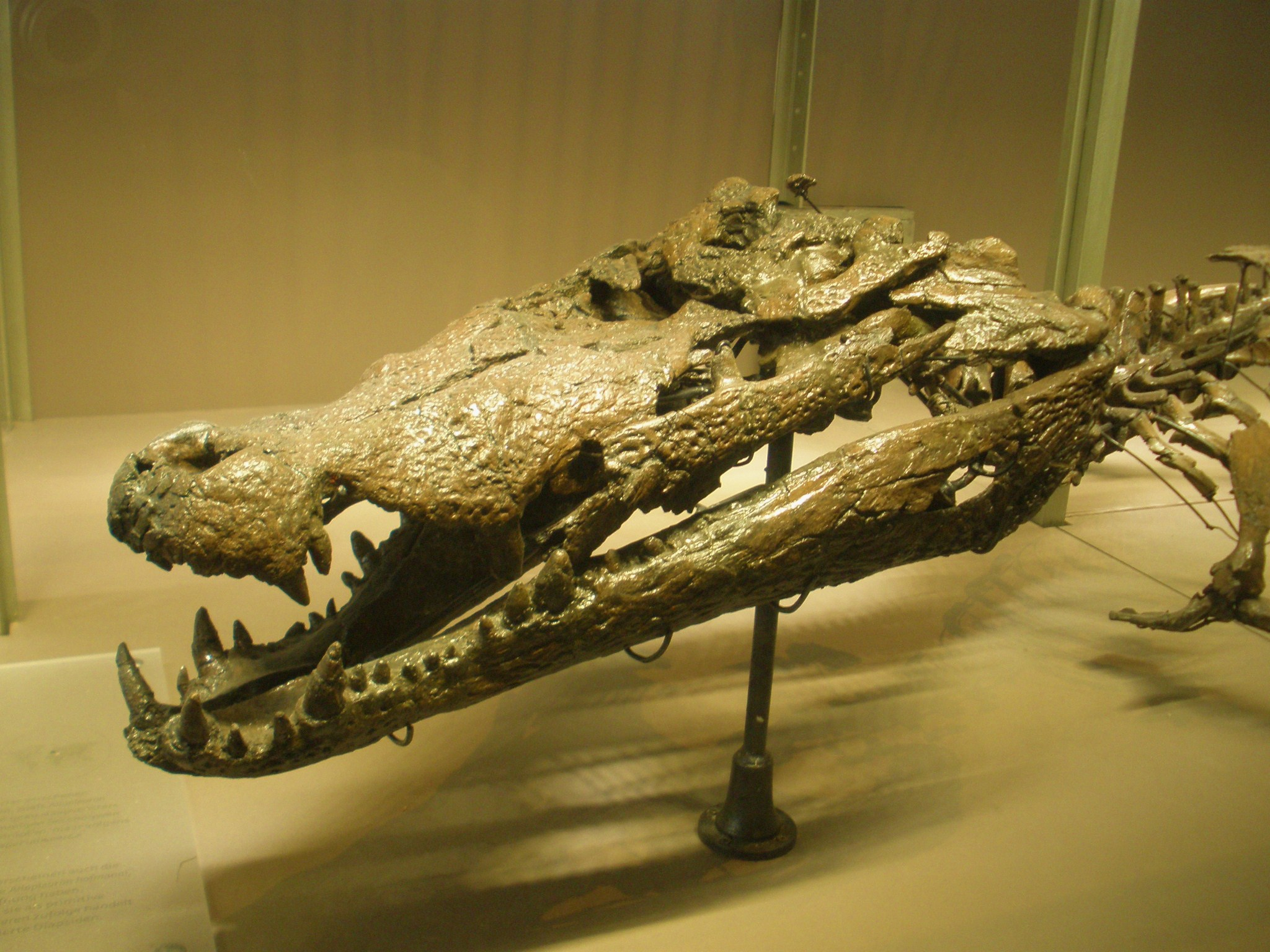
"A." depressifrons skull

"Asiatosuchus" depressifrons was first named in 1855 as Crocodilus depressifrons. The naming of this new species was based on a skull found in the Sables du Castrais Formation, France that dates back to the Early Eocene. The skull was illustrated in the 1855 paper but it was not thoroughly described. The fossil has since become heavily pyritized, losing much of its original anatomical detail. After its naming, several other crocodilian fossils in European museum collections were labeled as C. depressifrons. The species name depressifrons refers to the flattened shape of the frontal bone in the skull, a feature that is shared by all fossils attributed to the species. The fossils are also similar in having 6 pairs of teeth lining the symphysis at the tip of the lower jaw. As was the case for many other Paleogene crocodyloids, "A." depressifrons was originally placed in the still-living genus Crocodylus because the overall shape of its skull is similar to those of living crocodiles. Soon after Mook named Asiatosuchus grangeri, C. depressifrons was reassigned to Asiatosuchus.

Many new and much more complete fossils of "A." depressifrons have been found from Early Eocene deposits in Belgium. Together these specimens provide details on most of the skeleton. "A." depressifrons can be distinguished from all other species of Asiatosuchus by a combination of several characteristics including a large hole and a depressed area on the jugal bone of the skull, a frontal bone that does not touch the supratemporal fenestrae (two holes at the top of the skull behind the eye sockets), and a postorbital bone behind the eye socket that is visible when the skull is viewed from the side. Another distinguishing feature of "A." depressifrons is its lack of an overbite.

=== "A." nanlingensis ===
In 1964 Chinese paleontologist Yang Zhongjian named a new species of Asiatosuchus, "A." nanlingensis, based on fragmentary material from the Shanghu Formation in Nanxiong, Guangdong Province, China. Small coprolites (fossilized feces) were found alongside the type specimen of A. nanlingensis. A. nanlingensis was discovered concurrently with the similar Eoalligator chunyii, and a 2016 study proposed that they are synonymous. A subsequent paper argued otherwise, but other researchers agree with the initial assessment synonymizing "A." nanlingensis and "E." chunyii. Since then, different analyses have recovered the species as a member of Mekosuchinae, or as basal to a clade including mekosuchines and Crocodylidae.

=== Other species ===
Two species of Asiatosuchus were named from Russia, A. zajsanicus in 1982 and A. volgensis in 1993. A. volgensis and A. zajsanicus were regarded as nomina dubia by Angielczyk and Gingerich (1998) because they are based on fossil specimens that preserve very little anatomical detail. A. zajsanicus was later reassigned to Dollosuchus, a genus of tomistomine crocodilians, by Efimov (1988), but Brochu (2007) treated Dollosuchus as dubious.

Several crocodilian fossils from the Paleogene of North America have also been proposed to belong to Asiatosuchus. In comparison to A. grangeri, "Crocodylus" affinis from the Bridger Formation in Wyoming has a similarly shaped splenial bone in the lower jaw and frontal bone in the skull. Although "C." affinis is known from a complete skull, the skull material of A. grangeri is too fragmentary to support "C." affinis being classified within Asiatosuchus.

The crocodyloid species "Crocodylus" monsvialensis was named from Early Oligocene deposits in Monteviale, Italy in 1914 and reassigned to Asiatosuchus in 1993, although subsequent authors questioned this referral and considered it synonymous with Diplocynodon ratelii. "Crocodylus" vicetinus from the Middle Eocene locality of Monte Bolca, was assigned to Asiatosuchus sp. by Kotsakis et al. (2004) pending revision of the Mount Bolca crocodilian material.

A partial skeleton of a crocodyloid from the Sulaiman Mountains of Pakistan was tentatively attributed to Asiatosuchus. The fossil was found in the Middle Eocene Drazinda Formation, a marine deposit which has also preserved the remains of archaeocete whales. The presence of a possible specimen of Asiatosuchus in marine deposits suggests that these crocodilians could have tolerated prolonged periods of time in the ocean, an ability that would have aided in the dispersal of early crocodyloids across Europe and Asia.

== Phylogeny ==
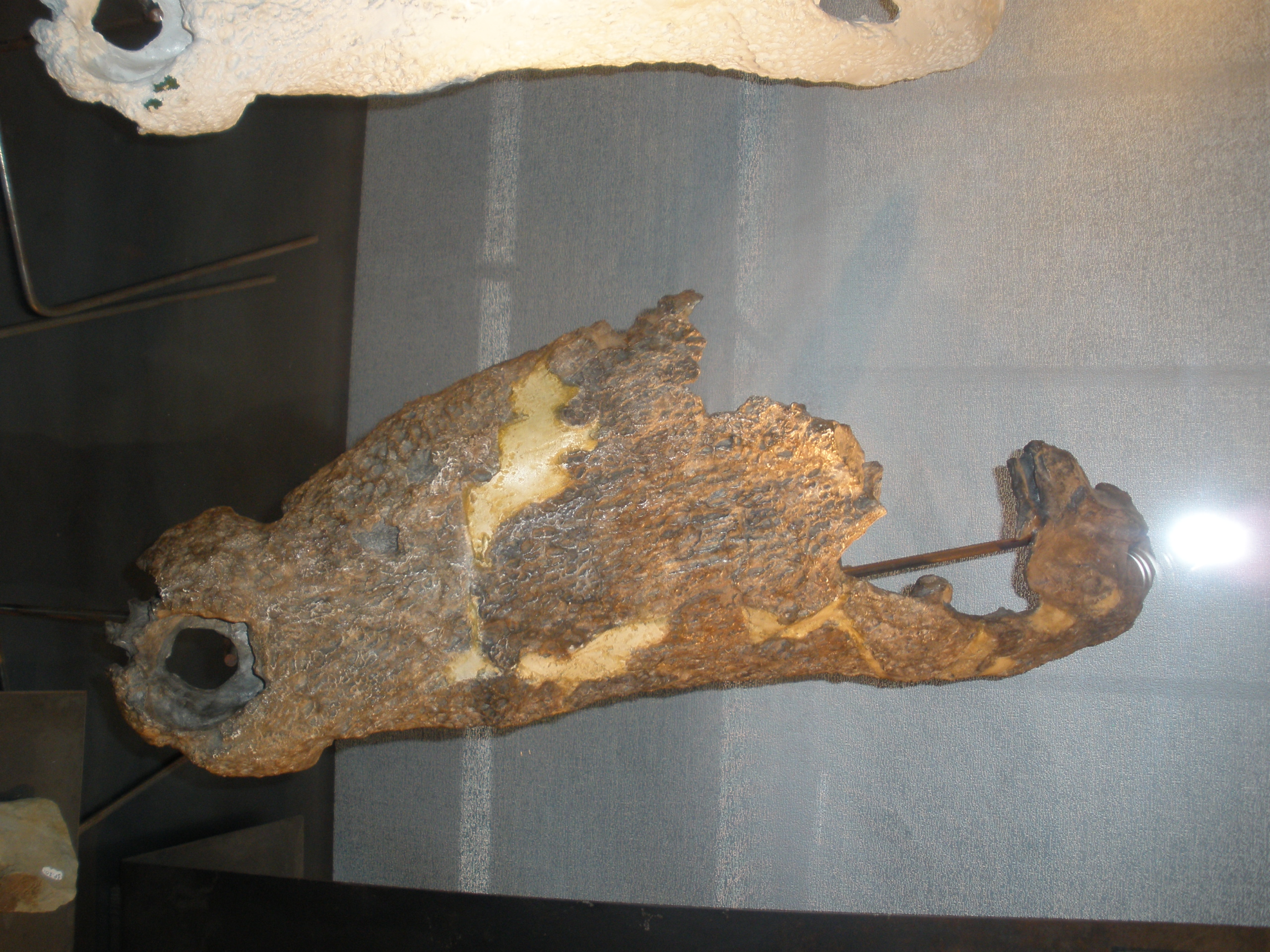
Snout

Phylogenetic analyses of the evolutionary relationships of crocodilians place Asiatosuchus as a member of a clade or evolutionary grouping called Crocodyloidea, which includes living crocodiles and their extinct relatives. Recent phylogenetic analyses place Asiatosuchus as a basal ("primitive") member of this clade, close to the split between Crocodyloidea and Alligatoroidea, the group that includes living alligators, caimans, and their extinct relatives. Many of the species that are most closely related to species of Asiatosuchus were originally classified in the genus Crocodilus because they superficially resemble modern crocodiles. However, the majority of early crocodilians, even some early alligatoroids, resembled modern crocodiles because a triangular, crocodile-shaped head is a primitive condition for crocodilians.

Some phylogenetic analyses have placed "Asiatosuchus" germanicus as the sister taxon or closest relative of a group called Mekosuchinae. Mekosuchines are a group of crocodyloids from Australia and the South Pacific that are unusual in that they were highly specialized for life on land. If "A." germanicus is the sister taxon of Mekosuchinae, it may have been close to the ancestry of the group. The earliest known and most basal mekosuchine, Kambara, lived during the same time as Asiatosuchus, suggesting that Asiatosuchus or an Asiatosuchus-like crocodyloid could have dispersed into Australia as the ancestor of mekosuchines. Despite the results of the phylogenetic analysis, "A." germanicus is an unlikely candidate for the ancestor of mekosuchines because it lived very far from Australia and the likelihood that it could have reached Australia from Europe is very low.

Most phylogenetic analyses do not support the idea that all species of Asiatosuchus belong to their own clade. Instead they find that Asiatosuchus species form a paraphyletic grouping, meaning that Asiatosuchus represents an evolutionary grade of successively more derived crocodyloids rather than its own separate lineage. Since a genus name is normally only applied to a monophyletic grouping by researchers who study prehistoric crocodilians, the type species A. grangeri is now considered the only valid species within Asiatosuchus. The species "A." germanicus and "A. depressifrons are written in quotes because they do not belong to Asiatosuchus and have not yet been given different genus names. The relationships of other putative Asiatosuchus species are uncertain because only A. grangeri, "A." germanicus, and "A." depressifrons have enough distinguishing features to be included in phylogenetic analyses.

Below is a cladogram from Delfino and Smith (2009) showing that Asiatosuchus species represent a non-monophyletic grouping. Delfino and Smith considered these relationships to have very weak support because only a few characteristics entered into the data matrix differed between Asiatosuchus species, and none differed between A. grangeri and "C." affinis.

- Crocodylia
  - Gavialoidea
  - - †Borealosuchus spp.
    - - †Pristichampsidae
      - - Alligatoroidea
        - Crocodyloidea
          - †Prodiplocynodon langi
          - †"Asiatosuchus" germanicus
          - - †"Asiatosuchus" / "Crocodylus" depressifrons
            - †Asiatosuchus grangeri
            - †"Crocodylus" affinis
            - - †Brachyuranochampsa eversolei
              - †"Crocodylus" acer
              - Crocodylidae

A 2018 tip dating study by Lee & Yates simultaneously using morphological, molecular (DNA sequencing), and stratigraphic (fossil age) data established the inter-relationships within Crocodilia, which was expanded upon in 2021 by Hekkala et al. using paleogenomics by extracting DNA from the extinct Voay.

The below cladogram shows the results of the latest studies, which placed Asiatosuchus outside of Crocodyloidea, as more basal than Longirostres (the combined group of crocodiles and gavialids).

- Crocodylia
  - Alligatoroidea
  - - Prodiplocynodon†
    - - Asiatosuchus germanicus†
      - - "Crocodylus" affinis†
        - - "Crocodylus" depressifrons†
          - - - "Crocodylus" acer†
              - Brachyuranochampsa†
            - - Mekosuchinae†
              - Longirostres
                - Crocodyloidea
                  - "Crocodylus" megarhinus†
                  - Crocodylidae
                - Gavialoidea
                  - extinct basal Gavialoids†
                  - Gavialidae
                    - Gavialis
                    - Tomistoma
