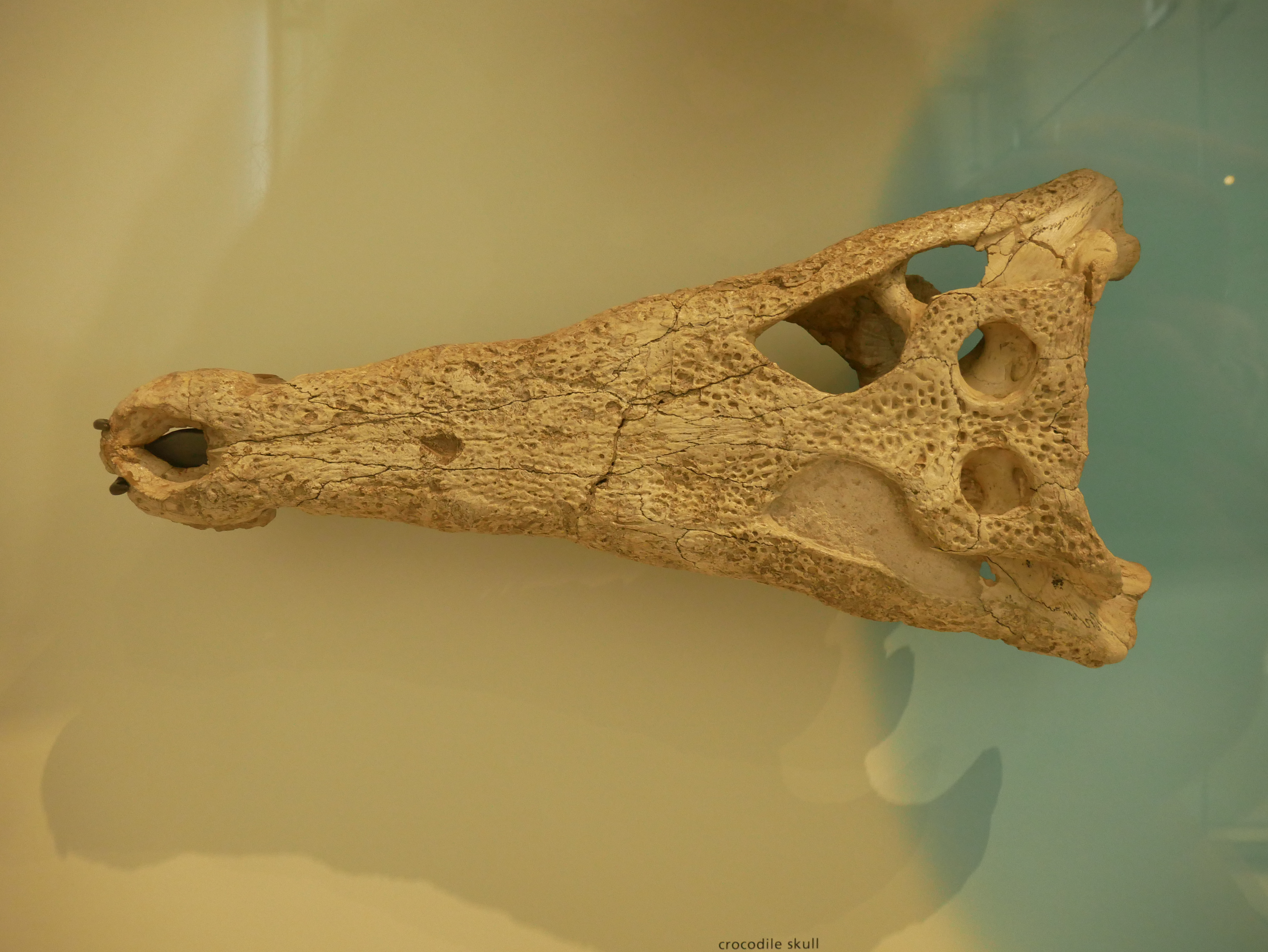

Scientific classification
- Kingdom: Animalia
- Phylum: Chordata
- Class: Reptilia
- Clade: Archosauria
- Order: Crocodilia
- Family: incertae sedis
- Species: †"Crocodylus" acer

Binomial name
- †"Crocodylus" acer Cope, 1882

= "Crocodylus" acer =

"Crocodylus" acer Temporal range: Eocene, 56–53 Ma

Extinct species of reptile

"Crocodylus" acer is an extinct species of crocodyloid from the Eocene of Utah. A single well preserved skull was described by paleontologist Edward Drinker Cope in 1882 and remains the only known fossil of the species. It was found from the Wasatchian-age Green River Formation. "C." acer had a long, narrow snout and a low, flattened skull.

Some postcranial bones have been attributed to "C." acer but they have more recently been suggested to belong to the related species "C." affinis. Although they were first placed in the genus Crocodylus, "C." acer and "C." affinis are not crown crocodiles. Recent studies place them as early members of Crocodyloidea, only distantly related to Crocodylus. Although it represents a distinct genus, a generic name has not yet been proposed for "C." acer.

== Phylogeny ==
A 2018 tip dating study by Lee & Yates simultaneously using morphological, molecular (DNA sequencing), and stratigraphic (fossil age) data established the inter-relationships within Crocodilia, which was expanded upon in 2021 by Hekkala et al. using paleogenomics by extracting DNA from the extinct Voay.

The below cladogram shows the results of the latest studies, which placed "C." acer outside of Crocodyloidea, as more basal than Longirostres (the combined group of crocodiles and gavialids).

- Crocodylia
  - Alligatoroidea
  - - Prodiplocynodon†
    - - Asiatosuchus germanicus†
      - - "Crocodylus" affinis†
        - - "Crocodylus" depressifrons†
          - - - "Crocodylus" acer†
              - Brachyuranochampsa†
            - - Mekosuchinae†
              - Longirostres
                - Crocodyloidea
                  - "Crocodylus" megarhinus†
                  - Crocodylidae
                - Gavialoidea
                  - extinct basal Gavialoids†
                  - Gavialidae
                    - Gavialis
                    - Tomistoma
