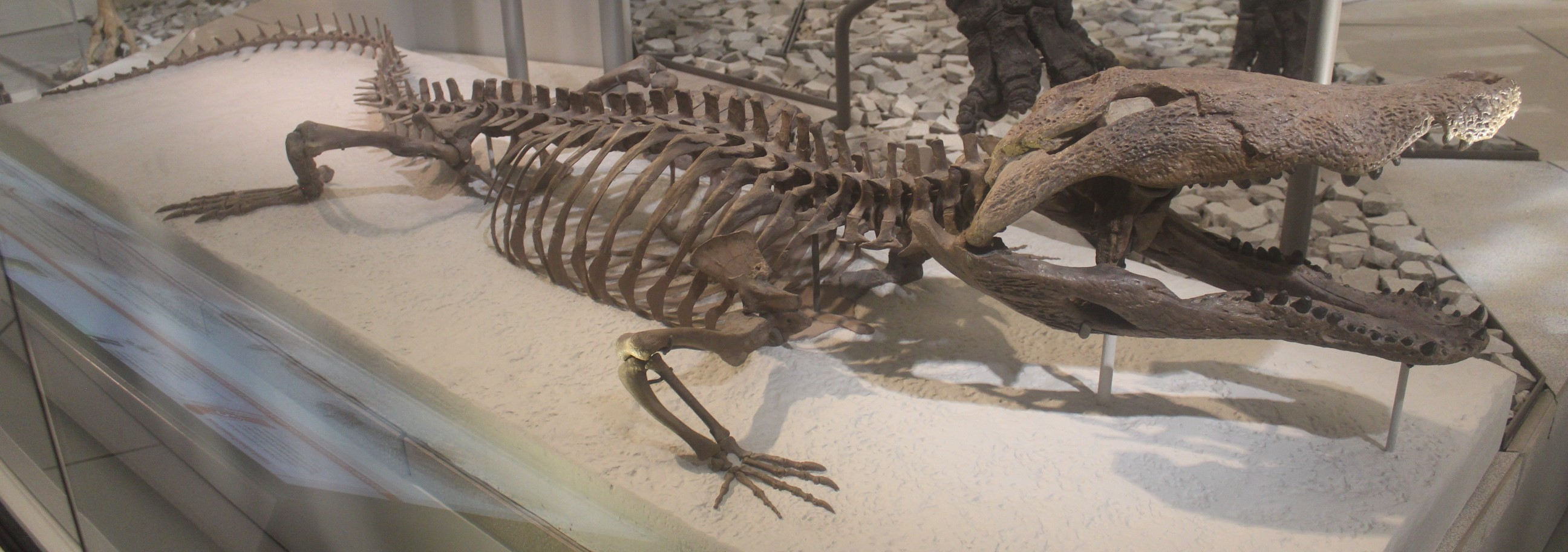
- Skeletal mount (USNM 12719), National Museum of Natural History

Scientific classification
- Kingdom: Animalia
- Phylum: Chordata
- Class: Reptilia
- Order: Crocodylia
- Family: incertae sedis
- Species: †"Crocodylus" affinis Marsh, 1871

Binomial name
- †"Crocodylus" affinis

Synonyms
- †Crocodylus clavis Cope, 1883; †Brachyuranochampsa zangerli Mook, 1962

= "Crocodylus" affinis =

"Crocodylus" affinis Temporal range: Eocene, 50.3–47.8 Ma

Species of reptile (fossil)

"Crocodylus" affinis is an extinct species of crocodyloid from the Eocene of Wyoming. Fossils were first described from the Bridger Formation by American paleontologist Othniel Charles Marsh in 1871. Marsh described the species, along with every other species of crocodyloid in the Bridger Formation, under the genus Crocodylus. The known specimen of "Crocodylus" affinis is a skull found at Grizzly Buttes, Wyoming, measuring 13 inches in length on the upper surface. Recent phylogenetic studies of crocodyloids show that "C." affinis is not a species of Crocodylus, but a genus has not yet been erected to include the species. Other Bridger species such as Crocodylus clavis and Brachyuranochampsa zangerli have been synonymized with "C." affinis.

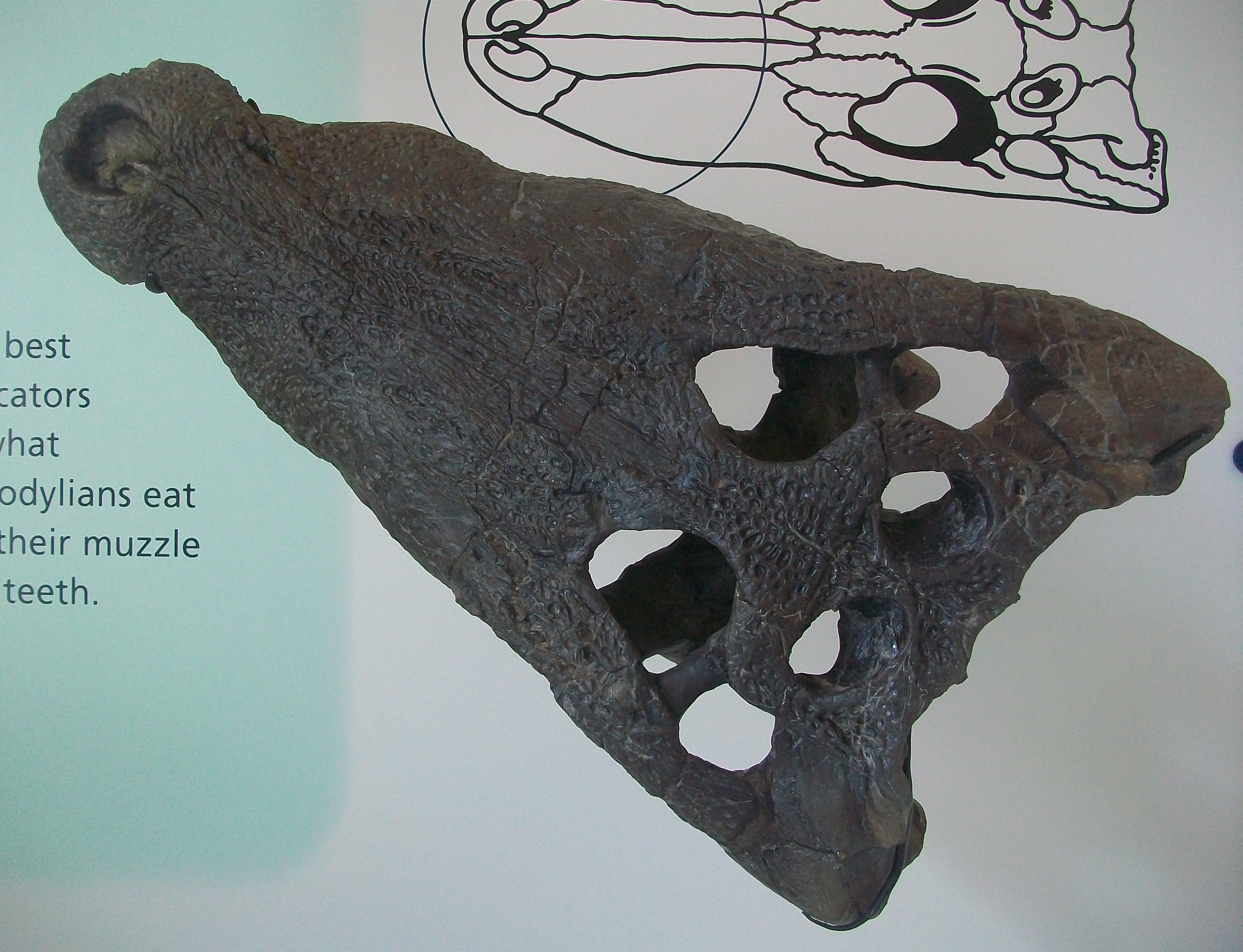
The holotype skull of "Crocodylus" affinis (AMNH 6177) on display in the American Museum of Natural History

A 2018 tip dating study by Lee & Yates simultaneously using morphological, molecular (DNA sequencing), and stratigraphic (fossil age) data established the inter-relationships within Crocodilia, which was expanded upon in 2021 by Hekkala et al. using paleogenomics by extracting DNA from the extinct Voay.

The below cladogram shows the results of the latest studies, which placed "C." affinis outside of Crocodyloidea, as more basal than Longirostres (the combined group of crocodiles and gavialids).

- Crocodylia
  - Alligatoroidea
  - - Prodiplocynodon†
    - - Asiatosuchus germanicus†
      - - "Crocodylus" affinis†
        - - "Crocodylus" depressifrons†
          - - - "Crocodylus" acer†
              - Brachyuranochampsa†
            - - Mekosuchinae
              - Longirostres
                - Crocodyloidea
                  - "Crocodylus" megarhinus†
                  - Crocodylidae
                - Gavialoidea
                  - extinct basal Gavialoids†
                  - Gavialidae
                    - Gavialis
                    - Tomistoma
