= Cenogram =

A cenogram is a graphical comparison of the average adult weight of mammalian species within a terrestrial area. In studying ancient communities, it is used to draw conclusions about biome, including whether a biome is species rich, its relative humidity and level of forestation. Cenograms were introduced in 1964 by J.A. Valverde in Terre et Vie and have become common in the study of prehistoric fauna of the northern hemisphere.
