= Brachyuranochampsa =

Brachyuranochampsa Temporal range: Middle Eocene, 56–33.9 Ma

Scientific classification
- Domain: Eukaryota
- Kingdom: Animalia
- Phylum: Chordata
- Class: Reptilia
- Clade: Archosauria
- Order: Crocodilia
- Genus: †Brachyuranochampsa; Zangerl, 1944

Species
- †B. eversolei Zangerl, 1944 (type)

Extinct genus of reptiles

Brachyuranochampsa is an extinct genus of crocodilian.

The only robust occurrence of Brachyuranochampsa is B. eversolei from the Middle Eocene of Wyoming. Another species, B. zangerli from the lower Bridger Formation at Grizzly Buttes, has been synonymized with another primitive crocodilian, "Crocodylus" affinis, also known from the Bridger Formation.

Phylogenetic studies have consistently recovered Brachyuranochampsa as more basal than the crown group Crocodylidae, which consists of all extant (living) crocodiles.

The below cladogram from a 2018 study combining morphological data and molecular DNA evidence shows the placement of Brachyuranochampsa within Crocodylia.

- Crocodylia
  - Alligatoroidea
  - - Prodiplocynodon†
    - - Asiatosuchus germanicus†
      - - "Crocodylus" affinis†
        - - "Crocodylus" depressifrons†
          - - - "Crocodylus" acer†
              - Brachyuranochampsa eversolei†
            - - Mekosuchinae†
              - Longirostres
                - Crocodyloidea
                  - "Crocodylus" megarhinus†
                  - Crocodylidae
                - Gavialoidea
                  - extinct basal Gavialoids†
                  - Gavialidae
                    - Gavialis
                    - Tomistoma
