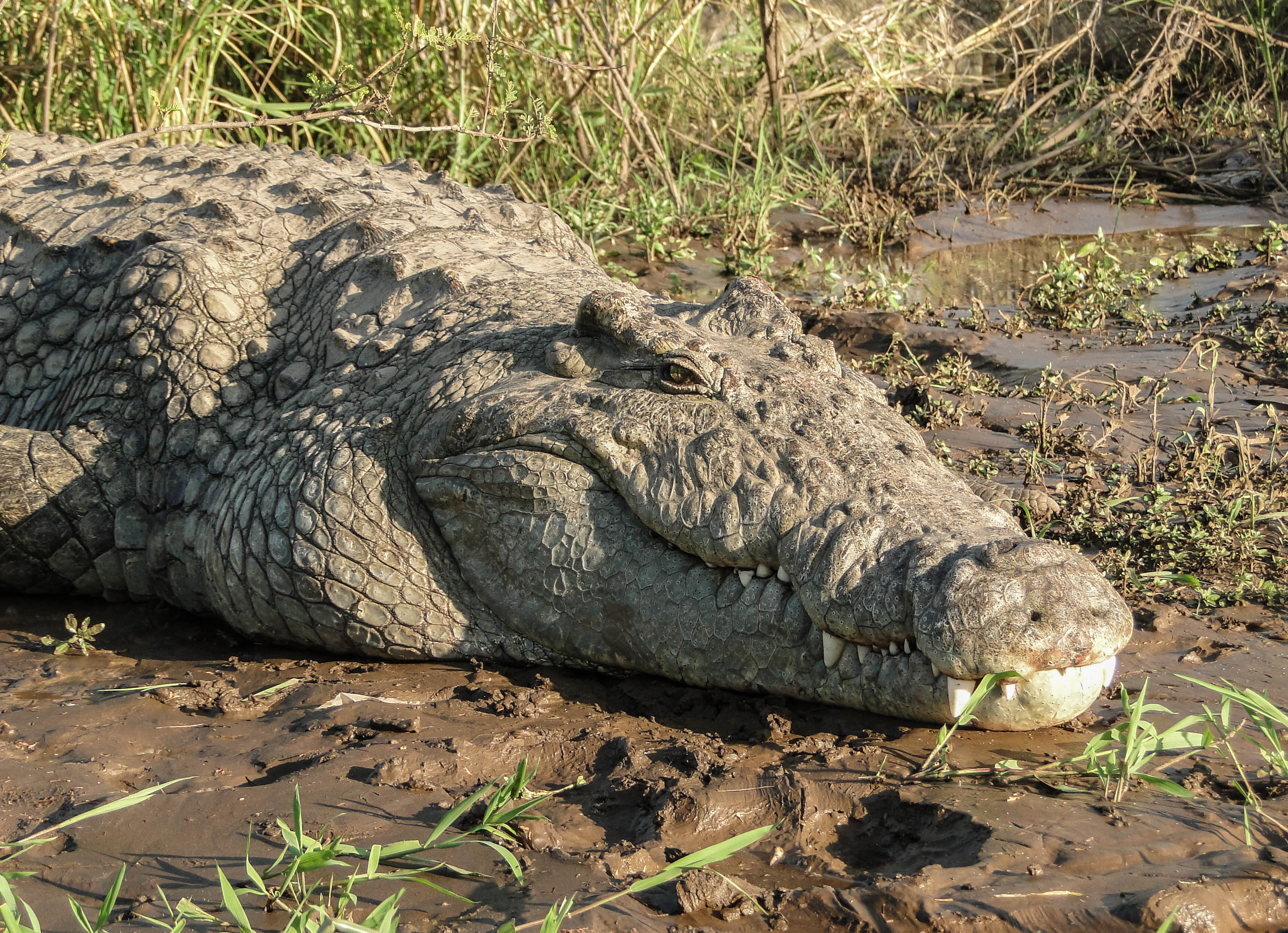
- Nile crocodile (Crocodylus niloticus)
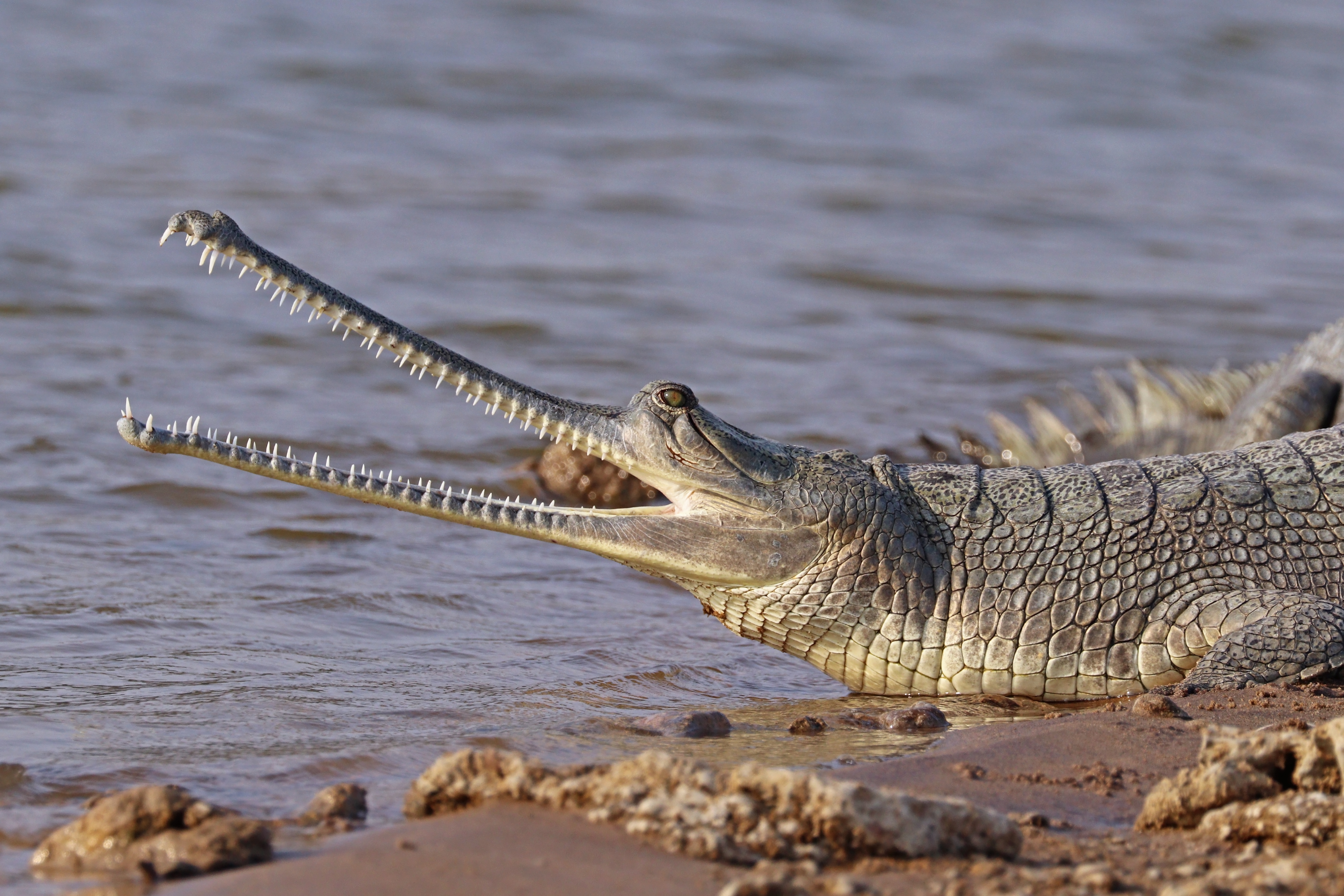
- Gharial (Gavialis gangeticus)

Scientific classification
- Kingdom: Animalia
- Phylum: Chordata
- Class: Reptilia
- Clade: Archosauria
- Order: Crocodilia
- Clade: Longirostres; Zittel, 1890

Subgroups
- Crocodyloidea; Crocodylidae; †"Crocodylus" megarhinus; †Mekosuchinae?; Gavialoidea; Gavialidae; †Kentisuchus; †Paratomistoma; †Maroccosuchus; †Dollosuchoides; †Ocepesuchus

= Longirostres =

Longirostres Temporal range: Maastrichtian–Present

Clade of crocodilians

Longirostres is a clade of crocodilians that includes the crocodiles and the gavialids, to the exclusion of the alligatoroids. Defined in 2003 by Harshman et al., Longirostres is a crown group defined phylogenetically as including the last common ancestor of Crocodylus niloticus and Gavialis gangeticus and all of its descendants.

Traditionally, crocodiles and alligators were considered more closely related and grouped together in the clade Brevirostres, to the exclusion of the gharials. This classification was based on morphological studies primarily focused on analyzing skeletal traits of living and extinct fossil species. However, recent molecular studies using DNA sequencing have rejected Brevirostres upon finding the crocodiles and gavialids to be more closely related than the alligators.

Below is a cladogram showing the relationships of the major crocodilian groups based on molecular studies:

- Crocodylia (crown group)
  - Alligatoroidea (stem-based group)
    - extinct basal Alligatoroids†
    - Alligatoridae (crown group)
      - Caimaninae
        - - Caiman
          - Melanosuchus
        - Paleosuchus
      - Alligatorinae
        Alligator
  - - extinct basal Crocodilians† (including Mekosuchinae†)
    - Longirostres (crown group)
      - Crocodyloidea (stem-based group)
        - extinct basal crocodiles†
        - Crocodylidae (crown group)
          - Crocodylus
          - - Mecistops
            - Osteolaemus
      - Gavialoidea (stem-based group)
        - extinct basal Gavialoids†
        - Gavialidae (crown group)
          - Gavialis
          - Tomistoma
