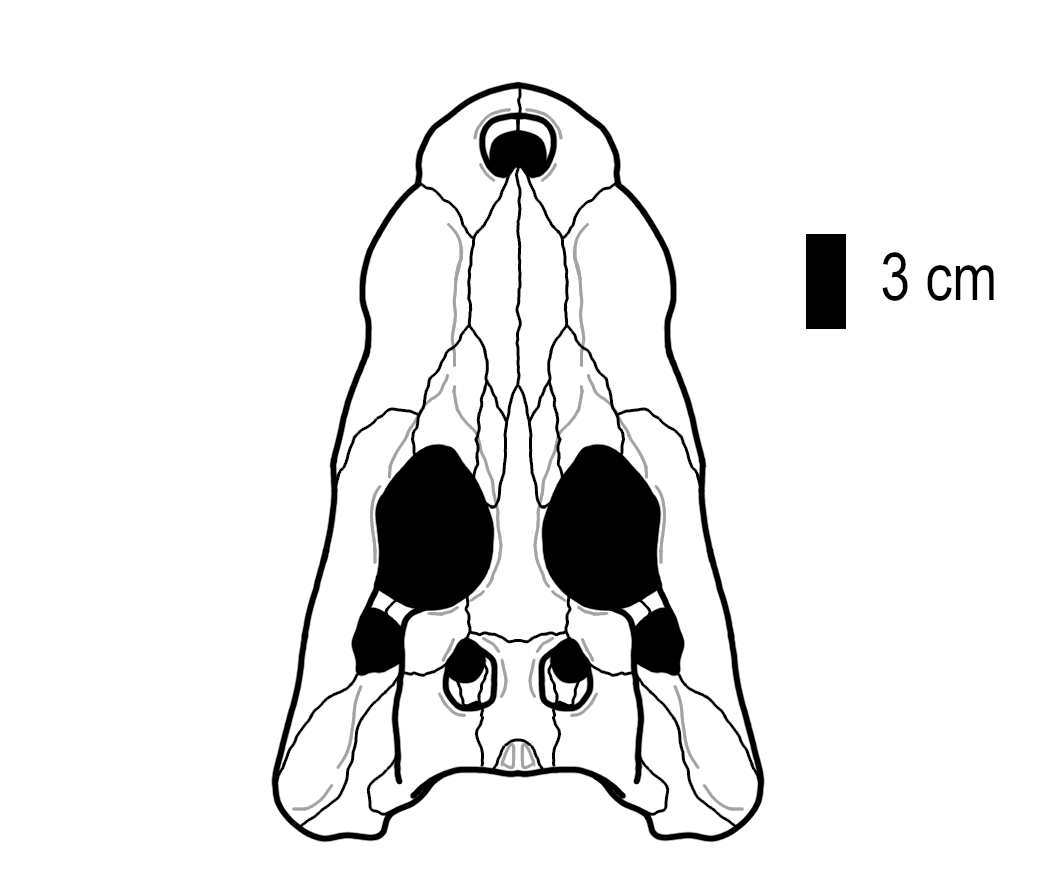
- Reconstruction of the skull

Scientific classification
- Kingdom: Animalia
- Phylum: Chordata
- Class: Reptilia
- Order: Crocodylia
- Superfamily: Alligatoroidea
- Clade: Globidonta
- Clade: †Orientalosuchina
- Genus: †Dongnanosuchus; Shan et al. 2021
- Species: †D. hsui

Binomial name
- †Dongnanosuchus hsui Shan et al. 2021

= Dongnanosuchus =

Dongnanosuchus Temporal range: Eocene Middle Eocene–Late Eocene

Extinct genus of crocodilians

Dongnanosuchus is an extinct monotypic genus of orientalosuchin crocodilian known from the middle to late Eocene Youganwo Formation of China. Like other members of Orientalosuchina, Dongnanosuchus was a comparably small-bodied animal with a short, rounded snout that shares characteristics with both early alligatoroids and crocodylids, rendering the precise placement of the clade uncertain. It contains a single species, Dongnanosuchus hsui, which lived during the latter part of the Eocene in what is now the Maoming Basin of China, which at the time featured subtropical forests and a prominent lake that would be the foundation of the local oil shale. This environment was shared by the tomistomine Maomingosuchus and similar cohabitation between Maomingosuchus and orientalosuchins is known from similar sites across East Asia.

== History and naming ==
Dongnanosuchus is exclusively known from China's Maoming Basin, which has previously yielded the fossil remains of the early gavialoid Maomingosuchus. In addition to this long-snouted animal, Skutschas and colleagues mentioned a second crocodilian from the Youganwo Formation with a noticeably shorter snout in 2014. Though the material was too incomplete for detailed study, with it neither being complete enough to be assigned to any known species nor to be confirmed to be its own taxon. Pavel P. Skutschas and colleagues therefore regarded it as an indetermined alligatorid, with them simply referring to it as the Maoming alligator. Later work on the oil shale beds of the basin led to the discovery of 4 additional skulls, housed at the Darwin Museum in Keelung, Taiwan. These new skulls, which were shown to have belonged to the same taxon as the Maoming alligator, would come to be described in 2019 under the name Dongnanosuchus by Hsi-yin Shan and colleagues.

The name Dongnanosuchus is derived from the latinized name of the fossil quarry that yielded the material in combination with the Greek "soûkhos" meaning crocodile, derived from the Egyptian god Sobek. The species name on the other hand honors Dr. Wei-Chieh Hsu, who provided Shan and colleagues with access to the four skulls crucial in describing the genus.

== Description ==
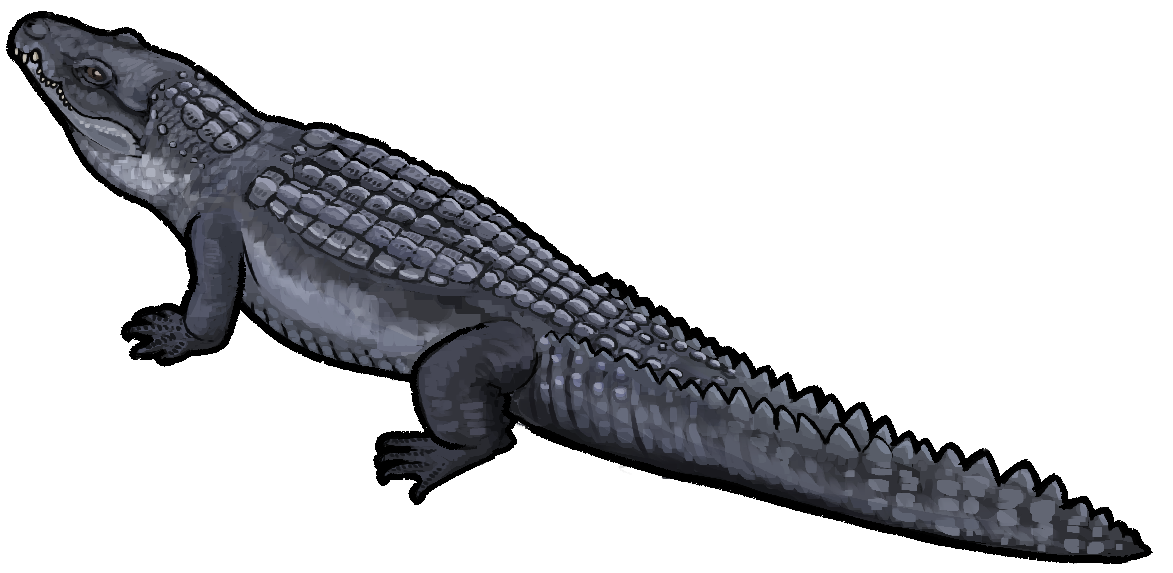
Life restoration of Dongnanosuchus hsui

In general proportions, Dongnanosuchus had a short and rounded snout, which was only slightly longer than the remainder of the skull like in the related Jiangxisuchus. The tip of the snout holds the opening of the external nares, which are slightly wider than long and open upwards as is typical for crocodilians. Also similar to many crocodilians is the sinuous appearance of the skull when looked at from above. This is caused by the main elements of the snout, the premaxilla and maxilla, featuring a dental margin marked by concavities in some areas while others are convex and bulge out, something also known as festooning. The first notably concave region of the dental margin is located where the premaxillae meet the maxillae, like in Jiangxisuchus. This notch, which is also seen in species of the genus Crocodylus among modern taxa, serves to receive the largest tooth of the lower jaw, the fourth dentary, when the jaws are closed. However, Dongnanosuchus does differ in the specifics regarding this anatomy. While in other crocodilians, like the early alligatoroid Leidyosuchus, the fourth dentary tooth passes cleanly through the notch, leaving the very tip of the tooth exposed when looking at the skull from above, in Dongnanosuchus it actually slides into a pit located in the dorsal wall of the notch. Due to this, the notch appears much shallower from a vertical angle, with the side view actually revealing it to be much deeper. Another less pronounced concavity can be seen further back along the outer edge of the maxilla between the tooth sockets of the seventh and eighth dental alveoli, although here the dentary tooth does not slide into the notch and rather into a pit between the alveoli. While the concavities generally correspond with enlarged teeth in the lower jaw, the convexities coincide with enlarged teeth in the upper jaw. This specifically means that the first festoon of the maxilla is at the same level as the fifth maxillary tooth (the largest of the maxillary toothrow), while the second festoon coincides with the eleventh maxillary tooth.

The premaxillae surround most of the nares, with the exception of a small section towards the back where the nasal bones insert themselves between them. The surface of the snout is slightly raised where these bones meet and the premaxillae form a process that extends backwards along the nasals until the position of the third maxillary tooth. The paired nasals are described as strap-like and widen slightly as they extend towards the back of the skull, until they come into contact with the lacrimal bones, at which point they diverge into two similarly pointed albeit shorter processes that insert themselves between the prefrontals and the frontal bone. The lacrimals are large, irregular bones noted for their great size, being much longer than both the prefrontals and the frontal.

The skull of Dongnanosuchus features a series of interconnected ridges, beginning with the preorbital ridges that gradually emerge behind the premaxillae and stretch along the suture formed between the maxillae and the nasals and across the midline of the lacrimal bones. As the preorbital ridges approach the eyesockets, they meet the ridges that mark the upper margin of the eyesockets (orbits), which stretch across the prefrontals, frontal and even the postorbitals. Another ridge is located below the orbits and stretches across the lacrimal and jugals. The eyesockets, which like the nares face upwards, are large and eliptical and overall the largest opening in the skull of Dongnanosuchus. Behind them lie the infratemporal fenestra, separated by the postorbital bar. These appear as taller than wide triangular openings. The jugals form much of the lower margin of the orbits and the infratemporal fenestrae as well as part of the postorbital bar before connecting to the quadratojugals. While the quadratojugals do not participate in the infratemporal bar (the stretch of bone beneath the fenestrae), they do form the back edge of the opening and do not project into it. Behind the quadratojugals lie the quadrate bones, which alongside the squamosals form the otic recess (a part of the ear).

The skull table, a raised part of the skull located behind the eyes, is wider than it is long and bears the two supratemporal fossae. These openings broadly divide the element into two regions, a pre-supratemporal bar (the region between the eyesockets and the fenestrae) and the post-supratemporal bar (the region between the fenestrae and the back of the skull table), with the former being shorter than the latter. The supratemporal fenestrae, located in the wider supratemporal fossae, are only about half the length of the eyesockets, making them the smallest of the skull openings. The frontal bone functions as somewhat of a bridge between the snout and the skull table, stretching from its narrow anterior process until the bone's straight contact with the parietal bone, just before the supratemporal fossa (therefore excluding the frontal from forming part of the openings' rims). To either side of the frontal lie the postorbitals, which form the front corners of the skull table and also contribute to the postorbital bar, while the squamosals form the back corners and the parietals the posterior edge as well as the entire space between the fossae. The supraoccipital bone is also visible on the surface of the skull table through a triangular exposure and in some specimens the bone is ornamented by large pits.

The palate features several large openings on its own. The suborbital fenestrae are the largest of these openings, with their size comparable to that of the two palatine bones and almost as large as the entire region of the palate between them and the snout tip. Towards the tip of the snout lies the apple-shaped incisive foramen. The type description of Dongnanosuchus notes that the incisive foramen is located further back relative to the nares that open on the dorsal surface on the skull. The maxillae contact the palatines alongside a convex suture, with the palatines forming a triangular process that divides the maxillae and prevents them from forming part of the infratemporal bar (the region between the suborbital fenestrae). The maxillae do however form much of the outer edges of the fenestrae until they contact the ectopterygoids, with which they form a suture that runs parallel to the last five maxillary teeth. The pterygoid bones are split prior to the internal choanae, which are separated by a thin inset septum.

Comparably little is known about the lower jaw, as it is only incompletely preserved in one specimen and shut tightly against the upper jaw, effectively obscuring its entire upper surface. From what is visible, it can be determined that Dongnanosuchus did not possess an external mandibular fenestra. The mandibular symphysis, the region where the two halves of the lower jaw connect with another, is described as short. The dentaries reach back until approximately the fourth dentary tooth and the entire symphysis extends beyond the level of the sixth. The fourth dentary tooth is not just the largest tooth in the lower jaw, but also marks the widest point of the symphysis. The lower jaw shows a similar sinuous dental margin as the upper jaw.

=== Dentition ===
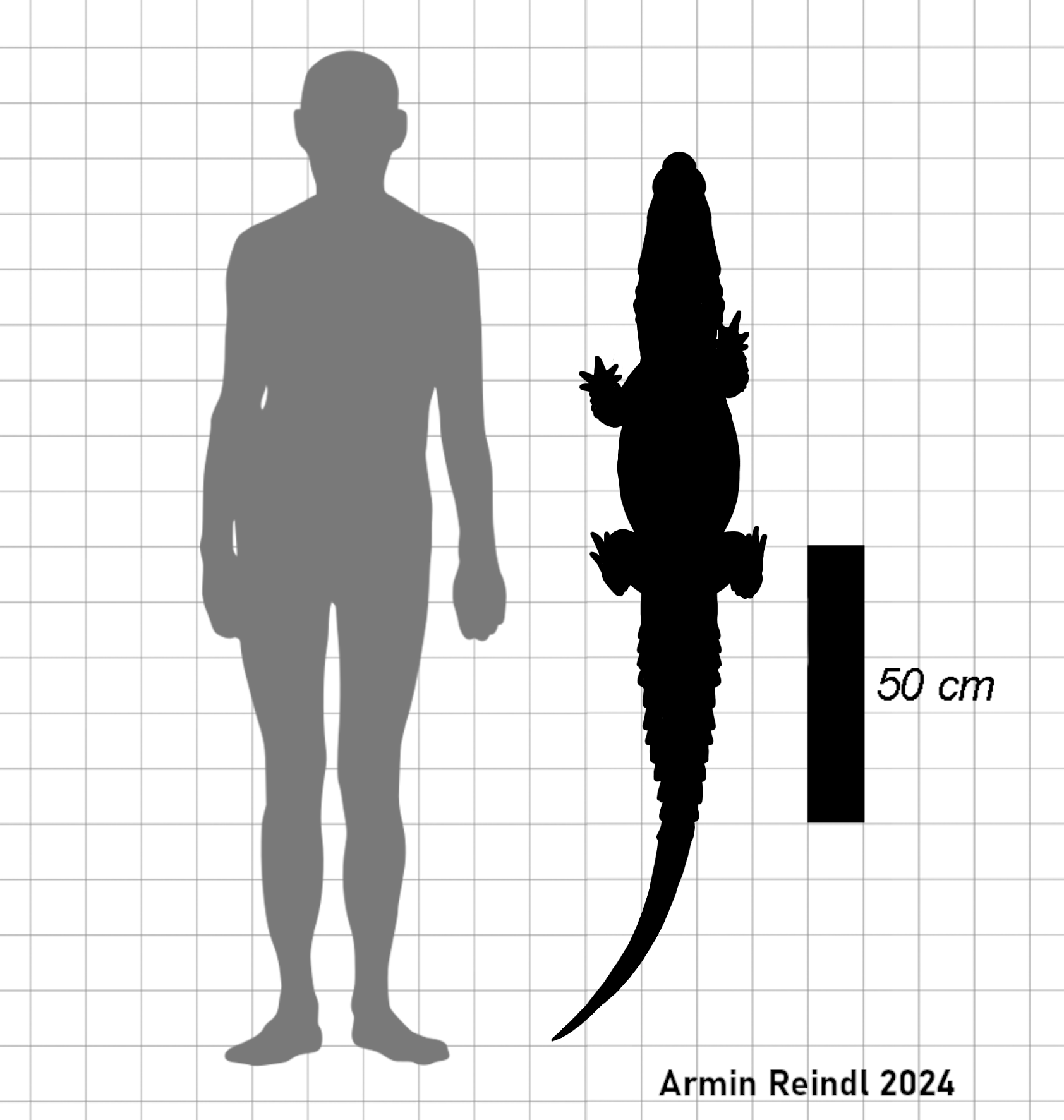
Like other members of Orientalosuchina, Dongnanosuchus was a relatively small crocodilian.

Though not every tooth is preserved, the number of dental alveoli still gives an overview of how many teeth would have been present. Based on this, Dongnanosuchus would have had five premaxillary teeth, with the first two being the smallest and the fourth being the largest. Preserved teeth show that these would have been conical in form with some degree of curvature to them, and that the crowns bear striations and smooth cutting edges (carinae). The premaxillary teeth are separated from the maxillary dentition by a large notch. Fourteen alveoli can be seen along the dental margin of the maxilla, growing and shrinking in a pattern that matches the festooning of the bone. This means that the regions where the maxillae reach their greatest width align with the largest teeth, namely the fifth and eleventh. The first nine all resemble the premaxillary teeth, being more conical in shape, however starting with the tenth tooth their shape changes noticeably: the bases of the teeth constrict, and the crowns are longer, a shape generally described as globular and common amongst early-branching alligatoroids.

Very little is known about the dentition of the lower jaw given that the only mandible is preserved in tight articulation with the upper jaw. What can be determined is that the fourth dentary tooth, which is similar in its morphology to the premaxillary teeth, was the largest of the dentary series and likely slid into the notch that separates the premaxillary and maxillary toothrows of the upper jaw. Unlike in other crocodilians, where the very tip of the tooth would be exposed, the anatomy of Dongnanosuchus suggests that it actually slid into a pit in the dorsal wall of the notch, leaving the tip obscured when the skull was observed from above.

In addition to the fourth dentary tooth sliding into a notch between the premaxillary and maxillary toothrows, several other areas show evidence of how the teeth of Dongnanosuchus would have occluded. Occlusal pits can be seen medially to the first two premaxillary teeth and would have received the first dentary teeth when the jaws were closed. Similarly, another occlusal pit is present between the seventh and eighth maxillary teeth.

=== Size ===
Like other members of Orientalosuchina, Dongnanosuchus was rather small in size, with Shan and colleagues referring to it as being "small to medium-sized", though no precise estimates are given. The holotype skull measured a little over 20 cm (7.9 in) in length when accounting for the missing areas.

== Phylogeny ==
Phylogenetic analysis consistently recovers Dongnanosuchus as a member of the clade Orientalosuchina, which had been named only 2 years prior to the genus' description. The type description argued for this clade to have been an early branch of alligatoroids, splitting from the group after taxa like Leidyosuchus, Diplocynodon and Deinosuchus but before the branching into Alligatorinae and Caimaninae. Shan and colleagues took note that their topology of Orientalosuchina did differ notably from that previously established by Tobias Massonne et al. 2019, with the former no longer recovering several North American alligatoroids as close kin to orientalosuchins as was the case in Massonne's work. The type description ran two analysis, with the first recovering Dongnanosuchus as having been deeply nested within Orientalosuchina, sitting in a polytomy alongside Orientalosuchus itself and the clade formed by Jiangxisuchus and Eoalligator. The second analysis proved to yield a better internal resolution, with Dongnanosuchus being the sister taxon to a clade formed by Orientalosuchus and Krabisuchus. Both are recognized to have their advantages, with the second analysis making more sense when considering non-morphological aspects like age and geography, though the latter is better supported when it comes to unifying morphological features, causing it to be favored by the authors.

The data matrix responsible for the first analysis of Shan et al. 2021 was later also employed in the description of Eurycephalosuchus, another Chinese orientalosuchin. The results of this study mirror the previous results in many ways, supporting Orientalosuchina as a monophyletic clade at the base of Globidonta. While there were significant differences in the composition and placement of other crocodilian groups, the internal structure of Orientalosuchina remained largely similar, with Krabisuchus and Protoalligator as successively branching early members while Dongnanosuchus remains a part of a polytomy with Orientalosuchus, the Eoalligator-Jiangxisuchus clade and now Eurycephalosuchus.

- Alligatoroidea
  - †Leidyosuchus
  - - †Diplocynodon
    - - †Deinosuchus
      - Globidonta
        - †Orientalosuchina
          - †Krabisuchus siamogallicus
          - - †Protoalligator huiningensis
            - - †Dongnanosuchus hsui
              - †Orientalosuchus naduongenis
              - - †Eoalligator chunyii
                - †Jiangxisuchus nankangensis
        - Alligatoridae

- - Alligatoroidea
    - †Leidyosuchus
    - - †Deinosuchus
      - †Diplocynodon
      - Globidonta
        - †Orientalosuchina
          - †Krabisuchus siamogallicus
          - - †Protoalligator huiningensis
            - - †Orientalosuchus naduongenis
              - †Dongnanosuchus hsui
              - †Eurycephalosuchus gannanensis
              - - †Jiangxisuchus nankangensis
                - †Eoalligator chunyii
        - Alligatoridae

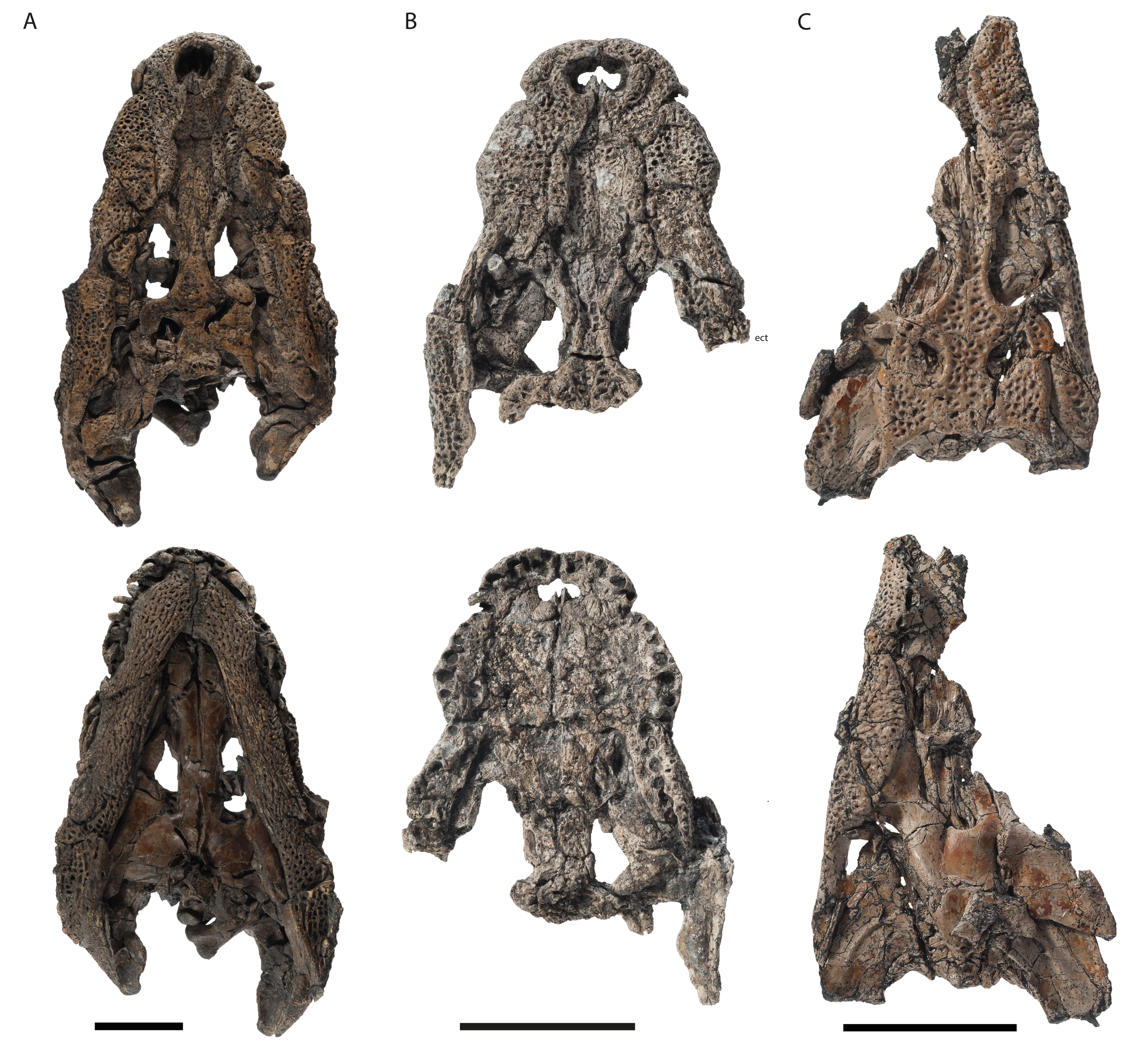
Some phylogenies suggest that Orientalosuchus may have been Dongnanosuchus closest relative.

While both these studies have found support for the placement of Orientalosuchina and therefore Dongnanosuchus among alligatoroids, other studies may suggest an alternative placement. Nils Chabrol et al. 2024 recovers both possibilities in their osteology of Crocodylus palaeindicus, with equal weighting of characters recovering Orientalosuchina as an early branch of Longirostres (crocodiles and gharials), while extended implied weighting of characters yields a more traditional position at the base of Alligatoroidea. In both scenarios Dongnanosuchus was recovered as the sister taxon to Orientalosuchus, with the main difference within Orientalosuchina lying in whether or not Krabisuchus and Eurycephalosuchus are successively branching taxa or form a clade of their own. Neither Jiangxisuchus, Eoalligator nor Protoalligator were recovered as members of Orientalosuchina by this team. Ultimately, the paper argues that the labile state of Orientalosuchina may be linked due to their early diverging nature, with them displaying both features of alligatoroids (like globular posterior teeth) and crocodyloids (like the premaxillary-maxillary notch) and even some that are intermediate between the two.

- Longirostres
  - - - †Eurycephalosuchus gannanensis
      - †Krabisuchus siamogallicus
    - - †Orientalosuchus naduongenis
      - †Dongnanosuchus hsui
  - - Crocodyloidea
    - Gavialoidea

- - - - †Qianshanosuchus
      - †Asiatosuchus depressifrons
    - - †Asiatosuchus germanicus
      - †Crocodylus affinis
  - - †Planocraniidae
    - Alligatoroidea
      - - †Eurycephalosuchus gannanensis
        - - †Krabisuchus siamogallicus
          - - †Orientalosuchus naduongenis
            - †Dongnanosuchus hsui
      - other alligatoroids

Perhaps the most unusual proposed position for Dongnanosuchus and other orientalosuchins is that recovered by Jorgo Ristevski et al. 2023 in their review of Australasian crocodyliforms. Their study focuses in large parts on the Mekosuchinae, a clade of crocodilians that lived in Australia and its surrounding land masses from the Eocene to the Holocene before going extinct. Though several of their analysis recover this group as it is traditionally thought of, in two of them members of Orientalosuchina were found nested deeply within Mekosuchina, wedged between large-bodied forms like Baru and more gracile dwarf forms like Mekosuchus. Despite this unusual placement, Orientalosuchina remains internally consistent with prior analysis for the most part with two exceptions. Protoalligator was not recovered as part of this grouping (though both Jiangxisuchus and Eoalligator were, in contrast to Chabrol et al. 2024) and Dongnanosuchus was found to have been more closely related to the gracile mekosuchines than to other members of Orientalosuchina, diverging just before "Baru" huberi (now Ultrastenos).

However these results are not without counterarguments. In addition to Chabrol and colleagues not replicating the same results, Ristevski and his team highlight that of the features connecting the two groups, many are either not present in all members or present in clearly unrelated crocodilians as well. This means that though this relationship is thought to be worth further exploration, support for Dongnanosuchus within Mekosuchinae is currently weak.

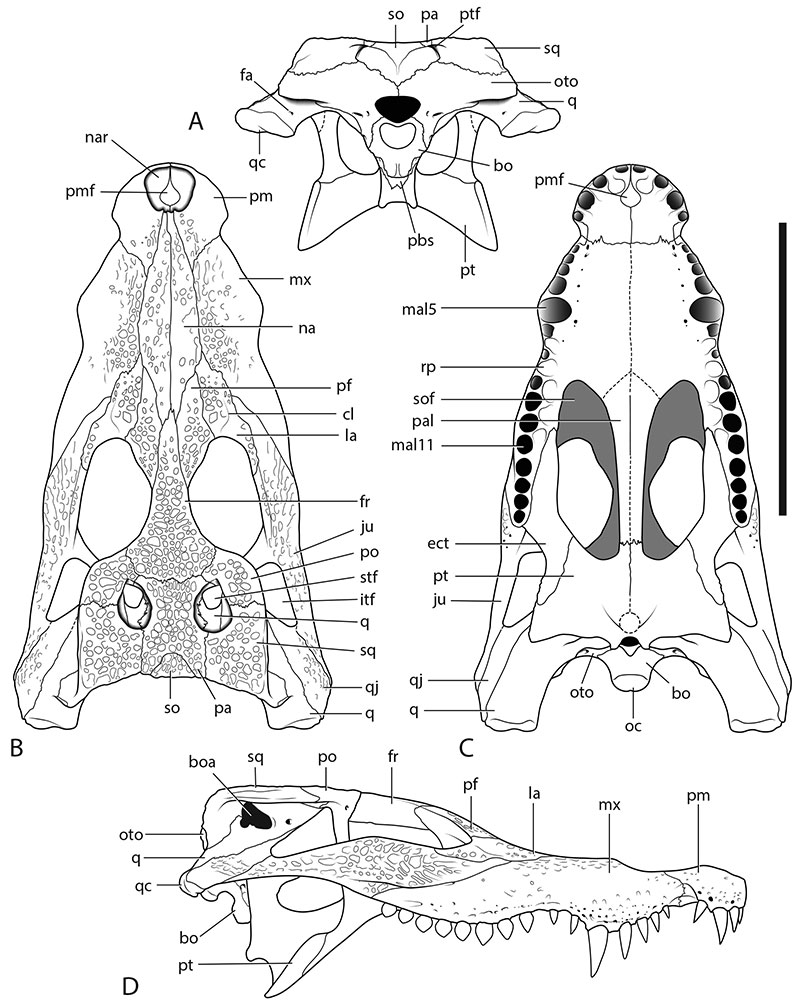
Another hypothesis suggests that Dongnanosuchus may have been more closely related to certain small mekosuchines like Ultrastenos rather than other orientalosuchins.

- Crocodilia
  - Alligatoroidea
  - - †Planocraniidae
    - - - †Prodiplocynodon
        - - - †"Crocodylus" affinis
            - †"Crocodylus" depressifrons
          - - †"Crocodylus" acer
            - †Brachyuranochampsa
          - Longirostres
            - Gavialoidea
            - Crocodyloidea
      - - †Asiatosuchus germanicus
        - Mekosuchinae
          - - †Kalthifrons
            - - - †Quinkana meboldi
                - - †Quinkana fortirostrum
                  - †Quinkana timara
              - - - †Paludirex gracilis
                  - †Paludirex vincenti
                - - †Baru wickeni
                  - †Baru darrowi
          - - Orientalosuchina
              - †Krabisuchus
              - - †Orientalosuchus
                - - †Jiangxisuchus
                  - †Eoalligator
            - - †Dongnanosuchus
              - - †"Baru" huberi
                - - †Volia
                  - †Trilophosuchus
                  - - †Mekosuchus sanderi
                    - †Mekosuchus whitehunterensis
                    - †Mekosuchus inexpectatus

== Paleobiology ==
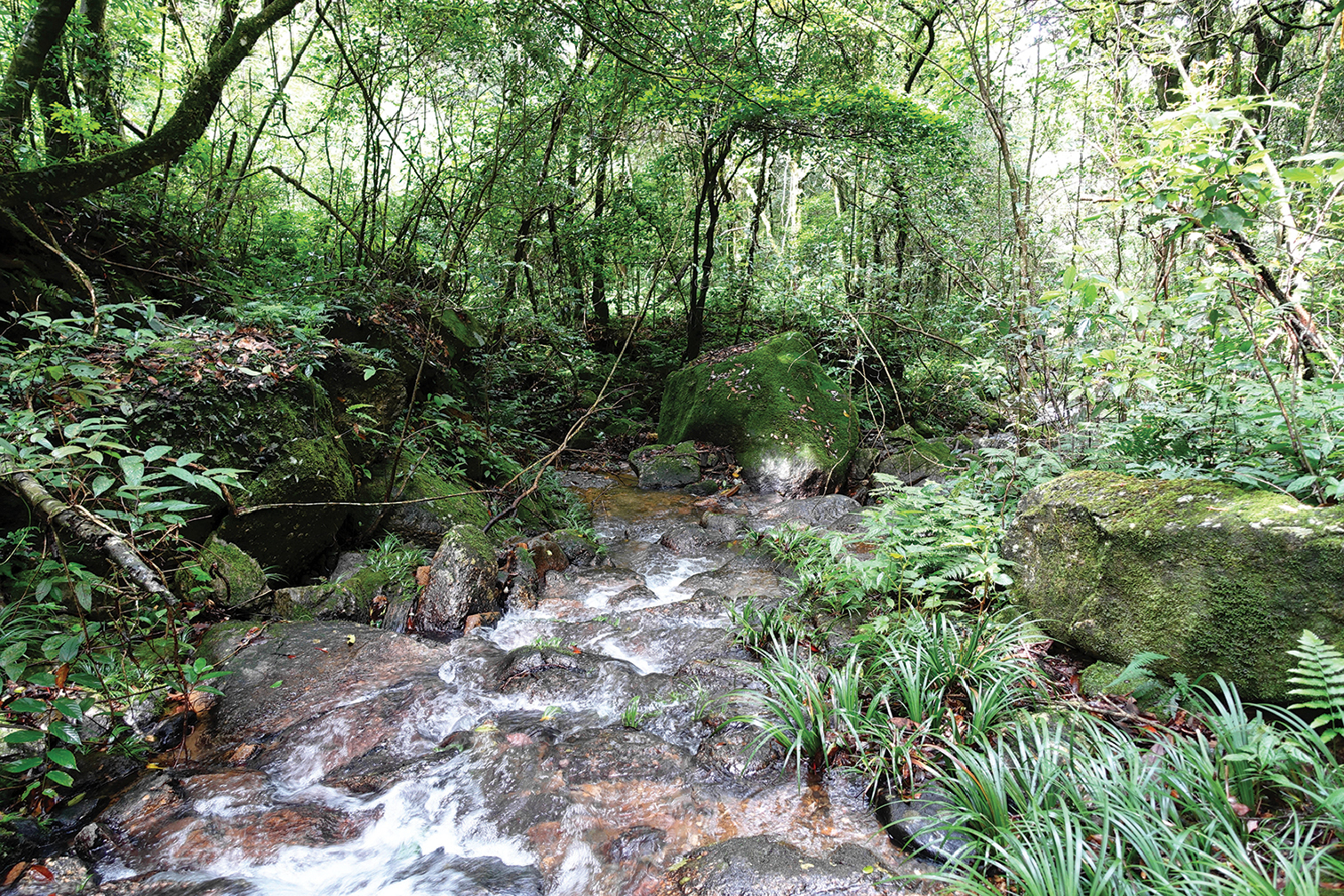
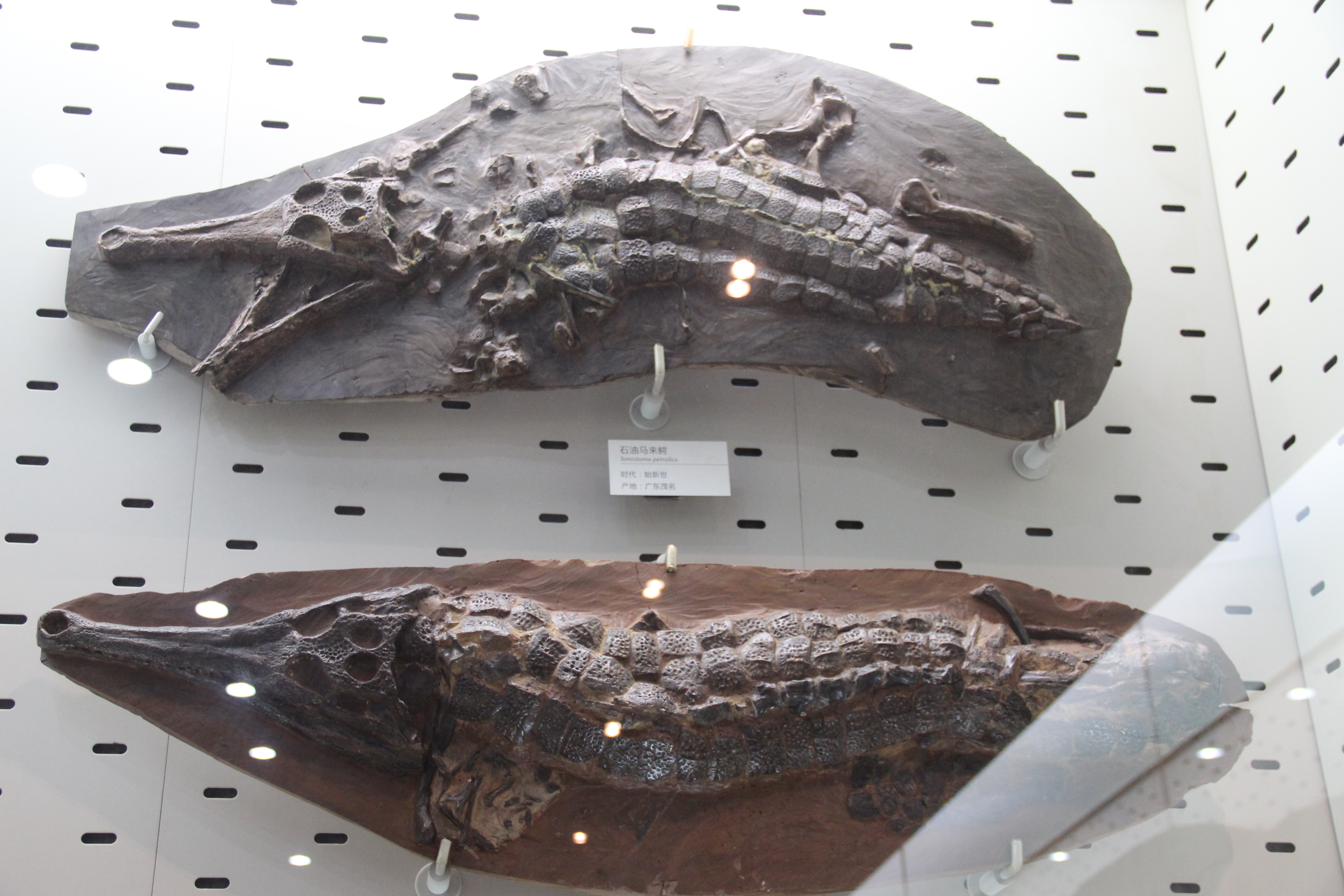
During the Eocene the Maoming basin experienced a humid subtropical climate (top), allowing for the presence of not just Dongnanosuchus but also the gavialoid Maomingosuchus (bottom).

Fossils of Dongnanosuchus have only been found in China's Maoming Basin, specifically from sediments of the continental Youganwo Formation that date to the Middle or Late Eocene. Analysis of fossil leaves suggests that the Youganwo Formation was deposited under humid subtropical conditions with hot summers, warm winters (similar to what is still the climate of the Guangdong Province today) and increasingly seasonal rainfall leading into the overlying strata. This change in rainfall leads from the non-monsoon conditions experienced by the region during the deposition of the Youganwo Formation to shift into monsoon-conditions in younger units. Furthermore, fossil leaves are morphologically similar to leaves that today grow under the influence of the Indonesia-Australia monsoon climate. The Youganwo flora, which is known from the lower parts of the formation, consists of ferns of the clades Osmundaceae and Polypodiaceae and a multitude of angiosperms, including the plane family, beech family, walnuts, cashews, elms and zelkovas, legumes and buckthorns. Fossil pollen furthermore confirms the presence of Dipterocarpaceae, which are a dominant component of modern Asian lowland rainforest canopies. Most common are Zelkova, a member of the elm family, the elm Platimeliphyllum, woody remains of a cashew relative as well as fruit and leaves of Paliurus. Fossils from another site within the lower Youganwo Formation further provide evidence for the presence of horsetails, aquatic ferns, podocarp conifers, lotus, laurels, staff-vines and palm trees. While the lower levels of the Youganwo Formation are thought to represent intermitten swamps and shallow lakes, deeper lakes formed the basis for the modern oil shales in the upper parts of the formation.

The fauna of the Youganwo Formation includes the nimravid Maofelis, amynodontids, and the anthracothere Anthracokeryx naduongensis. Turtles are numerous in the sediments of the Youganwo formation, represented by Anosteira maomingensis, Isometremys lacuna, Striatochelys impressa and an adocid. Given the lacustrine biome present, fish have also been recovered, namely Eoprocypris maomingensis.

In addition to Dongnanosuchus, one other crocodilian was present in the Maoming basin around the same time, the early gavialoid Maomingosuchus petrolica. Unlike Dongnanosuchus with its short and blunt snout, that of Maomingosuchus was long and narrow, much more like that of the modern false gharial Tomistoma. Remains of this animal are very common and several dozen skulls and skeletons of it have been found, making it notably more common than Dongnanosuchus. In 2014 Skutschas and colleagues speculated that this might be related to a difference in preferred habitats, with Dongnanosuchus (which at the time was still unnamed) possibly spending relatively more time on land than the narrow-snouted Maomingosuchus. In general, the two animals were likely not in direct competition with one another, with the long-snouted Maomingosuchus being thought to have been more piscivorous while Dongnanosuchus was probably more of a generalist. This pattern is repeated across several basins in the regions, which commonly see a species of Maomingosuchus coexisting with various species of orientalosuchins.
