= Eurycephalosuchus =

Eurycephalosuchus Temporal range: Maastrichtian

Scientific classification
- Kingdom: Animalia
- Phylum: Chordata
- Class: Reptilia
- Order: Crocodylia
- Clade: †Orientalosuchina
- Genus: †Eurycephalosuchus; Wu et al., 2022

Type species
- Eurycephalosuchus gannanensis Wu et al., 2022

Extinct genus of reptiles

Eurycephalosuchus is an extinct genus of orientalosuchine alligatoroid from the Late Cretaceous Hekou Formation of China. Known from a well preserved skull and mandible alongside various postcranial remains, Eurycephalosuchus possessed a skull that was unusually short and broad skull, even by the standards of other orientalosuchines. Its skull table is also noted for being unusually short and its dentition features both elongated caniniforms and bulbous molariforms. Based on the size of the skull, Eurycephalosuchus may have been the smallest member of its lineage. The Hekou Formation was also home to two other crocodilians, the possibly related Jiangxisuchus and an indetermined member of Brevirostres. The genus Eurycephalosuchus is monotypic, containing only a single species: Eurycephalosuchus gannanensis.

== History and naming ==
The holotype of Eurycephalosuchus was discovered in 2021 at a construction site for the Qingfeng Pharmaceutical Manufactory in the Municipality of Ganzhou City, in China's Jiangxi Province. The type locality was located only 50 km (31 mi) northeast of the type locality of the related Jiangxisuchus. The specific strata that yielded the material are known belong to the Late Cretaceous redbeds, which were part of the early Maastrichtian Hekou Formation. The Hekou Formation is part of the larger Guifeng Group, although some previous studies such as the description of Jiangxisuchus originally referred to the redbeds as belonging to the Nanxiong Formation. The block of matrix that preserves the material contained a nearly complete skull with the attached mandible, 16 vertebrae and 15 ribs, a partial front limb and several osteoderms, all of which together are designated as specimen IVPP V 31110. There is some compression that affected the skull during preservation, pushing parts of the frontal and prefrontal bones over the rear edge of the nasal bone amongst other deformities. The same locality also yielded a shoulder blade articulated with a coracoid which are thought to belong to another type of crocodile, only described as being a member of Brevirostres and notably bigger than Eurycephalosuchus.

The name Eurycephalosuchus is a composite word of the Greek "eurys" meaning wide or broad, "kephale" meaning head and -suchus, derived from the Egyptian crocodile god Sobek. The species name on the other hand specifically points to Gannan, another name for Ganzhou, where the material was collected.

== Description ==
=== Skull ===
While members of Orientalosuchina are generally known for their short and blunt snouts, Eurycephalosuchus stands out for being short-snouted even by the group's standards. The holotype skull measures 14.31 cm (5.63 in) in dorsal cranial length, meaning measured from the tip of the snout to the rear end of the skull table. Accounting for the compression the fossil underwent, a fully intact skull might have measured around 14.81 cm (5.83 in), which is approximately the same as the maximum width across the quadratojugals. Measuring from the tip to the snout to the end of the quadrate condyle would render a skull only slightly longer than wide. Other parts of the skull likewise show bizarre proportions. The snout itself is short, only 9.63 cm (3.79 in) long, shorter than it is wide and making up less than half of the total skull length. The skull table, which is typically shorter than it is wide in crocodilians, takes this condition to an extreme. The length of this element is two thirds smaller than its width, with Wu and colleagues going as far as describing it as "unbelievably short", highlighting how this, much like the overall skull proportions, is unusual both for orientalosuchines and alligatoroids as a whole.

The premaxillae of Eurycephalosuchus are wider than long and almost entirely surround the external naris without forming a raised rim. However, given that the holotype is damaged it is not entirely clear whether or not the naris would have been a singular confluent opening that was wider than long as in Orientalosuchus or actually two openings separated by an elongated process of the paired nasal bones as in modern alligators and as has been proposed for the orientalosuchine Protoalligator. The posterior-most edge of the naris is formed by the nasals, with the premaxilla extending briefly along their edge to form short dorsal processes. A defining feature of orientalosuchines is the presence of a notch located at the contact of the premaxillae with the maxillae, a feature absent in modern alligators but present in true crocodiles. Such a notch is present in Eurycephalosuchus and similar in its anatomy to that of Orientalosuchus in being moderately deep and therefore different from the shallow notches seen in Dongnanosuchus and Jiangxisuchus. Right behind the premaxillae sit the maxillae, which are the broadest bones of the dorsal surface of the skull. When viewed from above the outer edges of the maxilla are sinuous, constricting at the contact with the premaxilla, reaching their greatest width around the large 5th maxillary tooth before constricting and broadening once again shortly behind it. Looking at the skull from the side shows that the maxillae exhibit a strongly concavo-convex ventral margin, a condition known as festooning. This results in two dental waves, which peak with the fifth and 12th maxillary teeth respectively. The maxilla continues backwards until meeting the lacrimal bone, inserting a small process between it and the nasals before sharply reducing into a lateral process that contacts the jugal bone.

Information on how the individual bones connect to another becomes harder to determine at the transition from the snout to the skull table due to the deformation of the holotype skull. Taphonomy has caused the broken frontal bone as well as the prefrontal bones to overlap the posterior ends of the nasals and parts of the lacrimals. The lacrimal bone is pointed towards the front, wedging itself into the maxilla, and broad towards the back, where the bone forms a process that contributes significantly towards the anterior margin of the orbits. The prefrontal likewise contributes to the eyesocket and is roughly triangular in shape based on the better preserved left side of the holotype. The frontal bone contributes a small part to the orbital margins and like in Dongnanosuchus is moderately broad between the eyesockets, with the interorbital septum being just a little broader than the space between the supratemporal fossae on the skull table. Though heavily distorted in the holotype, the eyesockets were clearly quite large compared to the supratemporal fossae and appear to have lacked the surrounding rim seen in Jiangxisuchus.

As is typical, the frontal broadens posteriorly as it enters the skull table and in orientalosuchine fashion just enters the supratemporal fossa. It contacts the rectangular postorbitals to either side along a oblique, concavo-convex suture and the single parietal bone at the midline between the fossae. Like the overall proportions of the skull, the supratemporal fossae too are wider than long. The bones that form the edge of the fenestra, sans the frontal, overhang the opening which differs from what is observed in any other member of Orientalosuchina that preserves this region of the skull. As in Dongnanosuchus, the space occupied by the parietal between the fossae is slightly narrower than the frontal is between the eyes. Also as in Dongnanosuchus it contacts the quadrate bone within the fossa and is simultaneously separated by it from the squamosal even though the two contact along an almost straight suture outside of the opening. The very back of the skull table is occupied by an exposed supraoccipital, which actually prevents the parietal from reaching the posterior margin.

The triradiate jugal bone contacts the maxilla and extends back to form part of the lower orbital margin and much of the ventral infratemporal fenestra. The bone consists of an anterior ramus which is broad but short, a thinner and longer posterior ramus and its contribution to the postorbital bar, which rises between orbit and infratemporal fenestra and joins the descending process of the postorbital. Its contact with the quadratojugal is oblique, with the dorsal contact taking place before the end of the infratemporal fenestra while the ventral contact is set much further back just before the mandibular condyle. The quadratojugal possesses a small spine that enters the fenestra and runs almost parallel its rear edge, something not known from any other orientalosuchines but similar to Brachychampsa. Like in Dongnanosuchus, Jiangxisuchus and Orientalosuchus, the foramen aëreum is located medially on the quadrate. Between the lateral and media condyles of the quadrate, the lateral is slightly larger.

=== Mandible ===
The lower jaw of Eurycephalosuchus stands out for its great increase in depth towards the back of the skull. The mandibular symphysis, where the both halves of the lower jaw meet, is shallow, only about 15 mm (0.59 in) deep, but the mandible increases to a depth 49.5 mm (1.95 in) around the position of the external mandibular fenestra. This means that the mandible increases in depth by over three times the number measured at the shallowest point. The symphysis is formed entirely by the dentary bone as in Orientalosuchus and Jiangxisuchus, reaches its greatest width at the position of the enlarged fourth dentary tooth and ends approximately at the level of the sixth dentary tooth. The toothrow in general displays a great level of festooning, being prominently concavo-convex to match the upper jaw.

The dentary forms the anterior end of the external mandibular fenestra, which is taller than it is long with a pointed top and a wider base. The other two bones that participate in forming the mandibular fenestra are the angular and the surangular. The angular bone forms the lower part of the posterior mandible, coming in contact with the dentary along a concavo-convex suture and forms a posterior process that forms the lower edge of the retroarticular process. The surangular meanwhile forms the upper part of the posterior mandible, coming in contact with the dentary along a convex suture that consists of a convex region closer to the fenestra and two processes that interlock with the dentary. These processes, of which one borders the toothrow, are nearly equal in length, which sets apart Eurycephalosuchus from several other orientalosuchines in which the upper process is much longer. After initially thickening posterodorsally, the surangular narrows as it approaches the mandibular glenoid fossa and eventually forms a sharp process that extends almost to the end of the retroarticular process. Both the posterior processes of the angular and surangular are noted for their smooth, unornamented surface, which like in modern crocodiles serves as a point of insertion for the pterygoideus posterior muscle.

The retroarticular process itself is mostly formed by the articular bone, triangular in shape, broadest around the glenoid and tapering towards the back until culminating in a ball-shaped end. The upper surface is concave with a weak but broad prominence while the ventral surface is deeply arched.

The splenials, located on the inside of the lower jaw, do not participate in forming the mandibular symphysis and are described as having a narrow, forked anterior and broad posterior ends. Among the two branches of the fork, the lower is the longer one and with the exception of not being as deeply forked is regarded as similar to what can be seen in Jiangxisuchus. The splenial bears the foramen intermandibularis caudalis towards its back, which like in Orientalosuchus and Dongnanosuchus is described as large and elliptical. While much of the foramen is formed by the splenial, the medial surface of the angular forms the posteroventral edge of the opening.

=== Dentition ===
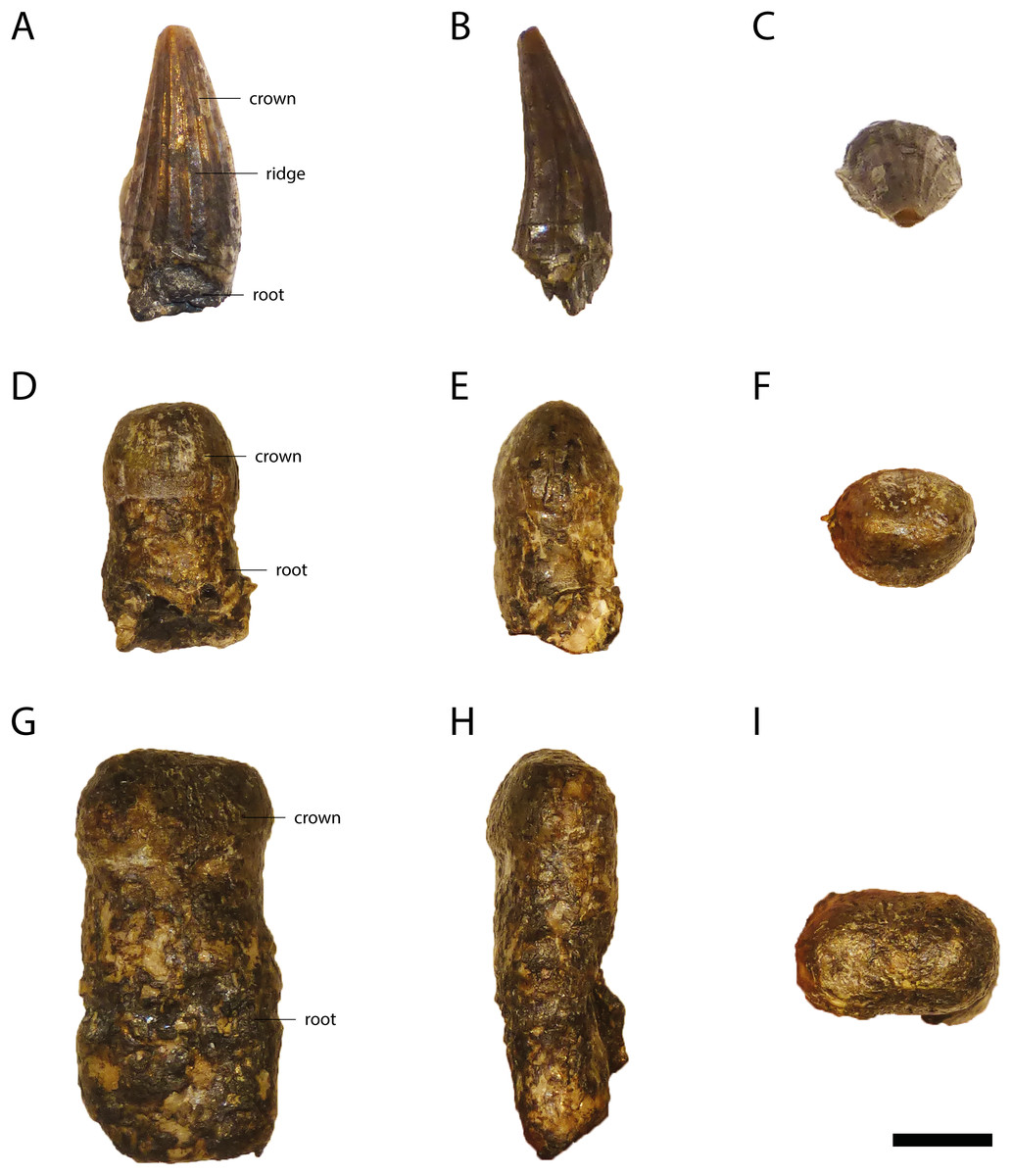
Like its relative Orientalosuchus, whose teeth are pictured, Eurycephalosuchus possessed a wide array of teeth ranging from blade-like teeth in the front to bulbous crushing teeth in the back of the jaw.

Each premaxilla of Eurycephalosuchus bears five teeth, followed by 14 teeth in each maxilla, adding up to a total of 19 teeth on either side of the upper jaw. The teeth show a distinct change in size throughout the toothrow. The premaxilla for instance features very small teeth occupying the first two positions, followed by enlarged third and fourth teeth that are followed by another very small final tooth just behind those. The first maxillary tooth, situated just behind the notch that separates the two regions, is similarly small. However, the dentition following it increases rapidly in size, culminating in a large caniniform fifth maxillary tooth. All subsequent teeth remain comparably small, but also exhibit a gradual change in size. The three teeth immediately following the fifth grow increasingly smaller, followed by a slight increase from the eight to the eleventh and finally a subtle decrease leading up to the last tooth of the maxilla.

Much like the size, the morphology of the teeth also differs depending on their position in the jaw. The premaxillary teeth are described as labiolingually compressed, meaning they are somewhat blade-like with flattened sides. These teeth are clearly separated into a labial (outer) and lingual (inner) surface separated by a weak and unserrated cutting edge, a carina. The labial surface is described as convex, the lingual as concave, with the former bearing subdued striations that lead towards the tip of their respective tooth. The early maxillary teeth are similar in their morphology, but by the eight tooth they begin to form a neck at their base. While the eight is only weakly necked, a strong neck is present from the twelfth tooth onward, which seems to coincide with an overall much more bulbous shape of the tooth crown. The degree of labiolingual compression also changes parallel to the development of a neck. The necked teeth are noticeably less flattened than their forebearers, rendering the lingual and labial surfaces much less distinct and the last few teeth are described as being nearly round in crosssection.

Much less is known about both the number and morphology of the teeth of the lower jaw, given that in the holotype of Eurycephalosuchus the jaws are tightly locked in their preservation. Most easily visible is the presence of an enlarged caniniform dentary tooth that slides into the notch that separates the premaxillary teeth from those of the maxilla. Such a tooth is a shared feature with other orientalosuchines and true crocodiles. As is typical for these forms, the enlarged tooth has been identified as the fourth dentary. It is not only the largest tooth of the lower jaw but also comparable in size to the enormous fifth maxillary caniniform. A slightly smaller tooth is situated further back in the lower jaw atop the second dental wave/festoon, which appears to represent the twelfth dentary tooth similar to Jiangxisuchus. Like the fourth dentary tooth, it would have interlocked with teeth of the upper jaw, specifically sliding into a pit present between the seventh and eight maxillary teeth. At least five more teeth sit behind this tooth, their bases visible beneath the overlying maxillary teeth. They seem to resemble their opposing teeth in size and shape.

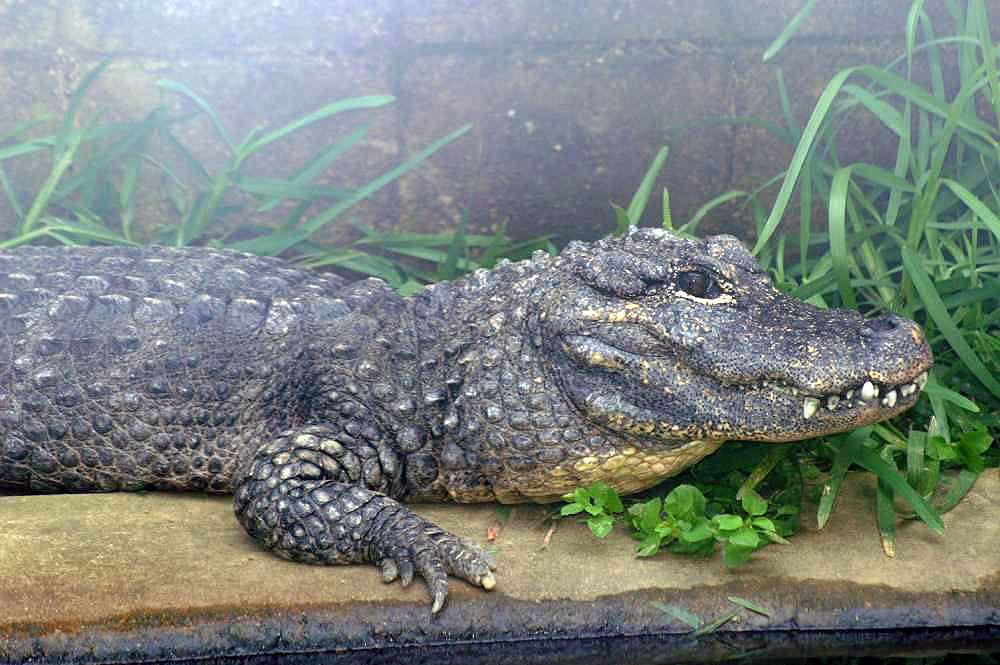
Like today's Chinese alligator, Eurycephalosuchus was covered in extensive armor covering its back, belly and possibly even its limbs.

=== Osteoderms ===
Three different types of osteoderms are known from Eurycephalosuchus, with many of them representing the square plates that would form the dorsal armor. These osteoderms bear a weak keel along their midline and articular facets towards their side, clearly showing that the back of Eurycephalosuchus was covered by multiple parallel rows of osteoderms. No such facets are known from the front or back edges, but the anterior margin instead bears a flat, unsculptured stretch. This suggest that the transverse rows wouldn't have articulated with another, but instead each osteoderm would have overlapped the one behind it. The same kind of pattern is also clearly visible in Jiangxisuchus, Eoalligator and Krabisuchus.

A second, less common osteoderm type is known from oval, well sculpted and keeled elements that may have either been positioned along the animal's flanks or on the upper parts of the limbs not dissimilar to animals like today's Chinese alligator. Finally, three flat osteoderms correspond with the ventral shield, the bony armor that would have covered the belly of Eurycephalosuchus.

=== Size ===
Wu and colleagues describe Eurycephalosuchus as the smallest member of Orientalosuchina. They state that the skull length of Eurycephalosuchus was slightly shorter than that of Krabisuchus and the occiput was narrower than that of Eoalligator. Previous studies on Krabisuchus have described it as small as well, with Jeremy E. Martin and Komsorn Lauprasert specifying that it likely didn't exceed 2 m (6 ft 7 in) in length.

== Phylogeny ==
For the phylogenetic analysis, Wu and colleagues reused the same data matrix previously used by Shan et al. (2021) in the description of Dongnanosuchus. The strict consensus tree recovered by the team reinforces the idea that Orientalosuchina were basal members of the clade Globidonta, a subset of alligatoroids that includes modern alligators and caimans. Orientalosuchina was recovered as a monophyletic group, featuring the five taxa the clade was originally defined by and Dongnanosuchus, described a year prior to Eurycephalosuchus. Within Orientalosuchina, Krabisuchus and Protoalligator were recovered as the two basalmost forms just like in the work by Shan and colleagues, followed by a large polytomy that consists of Orientalosuchus, Dongnangosuchus, Eurycephalosuchus as well as the clade formed by Eoalligator and Jiangxisuchus. The majority rule consensus furthermore suggests that Eurycephalosuchus could have been the sister taxon to the Jiangxisuchus-Eoalligator clade, which is congruent with the fact that all three taxa lived during the Late Cretaceous in what is now China.

- - Alligatoroidea
    - Leidyosuchus
    - - Deinosuchus
      - Diplocynodon
      - Globidonta
        - Orientalosuchina
          - Krabisuchus siamogallicus
          - - Protoalligator huiningensis
            - - Orientalosuchus naduongenis
              - Dongnanosuchus hsui
              - Eurycephalosuchus gannanensis
              - - Jiangxisuchus nankangensis
                - Eoalligator chunyii
        - Alligatoridae
          - Caimaninae
          - Alligatorinae

An alternate topology was proposed by Chabrol and colleagues in their 2024 redescription of Crocodylus palaeindicus. In this study, the authors highlight the labile state of Orientalosuchina and recover two trees with this clade being placed either as alligatoroids or as members of Longirostres. In both instances Orientalosuchina was not recovered with the same diversity as in the work of Wu and colleagues, only consisting of four taxa rather than seven. The tree in which Orientalosuchina were early members of Longirostres sees the group neatly split into two branches, one of which showing Eurycephalosuchus being most closely allied with Krabisuchus. The more conventional alligatoroid interpretation meanwhile sees it as the basalmost member of the clade, with Krabisuchus diverging after it and Orientalosuchus as the sister taxon to Dongnanosuchus.

- Longirostres
  - - - †Eurycephalosuchus gannanensis
      - †Krabisuchus siamogallicus
    - - †Orientalosuchus naduongenis
      - †Dongnanosuchus hsui
  - - Crocodyloidea
    - Gavialoidea

- - - - †Qianshanosuchus
      - †Asiatosuchus depressifrons
    - - †Asiatosuchus germanicus
      - †Crocodylus affinis
  - - †Planocraniidae
    - Alligatoroidea
      - - †Eurycephalosuchus gannanensis
        - - †Krabisuchus siamogallicus
          - - †Orientalosuchus naduongenis
            - †Dongnanosuchus hsui
      - other alligatoroids

== Paleobiology ==
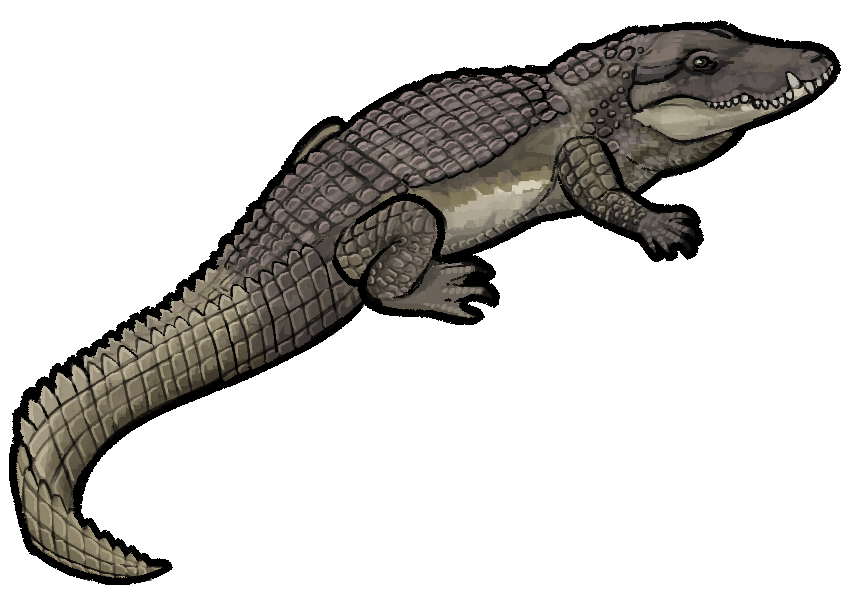
Jiangxisuchus nankangensis, a contemporary crocodilian that may have been closely related to Eurycephalosuchus.

The red beds of the Hekou Formation, in some publications assigned to the Nanxiong Formation, are well known for their extensive fossil fauna, especially dinosaurs. The dinosaur fauna of the Hekou Formation is high in species richness but low in overall clade diversity, primarily consisting of oviraptorosaurs (represented by around a dozen distinct genera). Tyrannosaurs are represented by two forms, the small but deep-snouted Asiatyrannus and the long-snouted Qianzhousaurus, with the latter filling the role of apex predator. Two sauropods, Gannansaurus and Jiangxititan, and hadrosaurs fill the niches of large herbivores. The small fauna meanwhile features squamates like Conicodontosaurus, Chianghsia and Tianyusaurus, the turtles Jiangxichelys and Nanhsiungchelys as well as the mammal Erythrobaatar.

The Hekou Formation is marked by the influence of rivers and is thought to have been deposited in a subhumid environment in the proximal parts of an alluvial fan. Streams would have spread out beyond the fan, stretching across a floodplain.

Two other crocodilians are also known from the redbeds. The first of these is Jiangxisuchus, which depending on the study may represent a closely related orientalosuchine or an unrelated small-bodied crocodyloid with a short but comparably more pointed snout. The other is so far only assigned to the clade Brevirostres and was described alongside Eurycephalosuchus. This indeterminate brevirostrine was significantly larger than Eurycephalosuchus, with its coracoid being 135% larger than that of the orientalosuchine. Comparison with the modern Chinese alligator would suggest that this larger animal could have had a skull length of around 18 cm (7.1 in). While it is unclear whether all these crocodilians would have actually coexisted with each other, sympatry is not uncommon in fossil and modern crocodiles. Based on such cases, the taxa could have differed in various ways including habitat preferences and tolerance, behavior and ecology. However, especially the latter is difficult to assess given that the indeterminate brevirostrine lacks skull remains, though its greater size might indicate that it was the more dominant of the two species.
