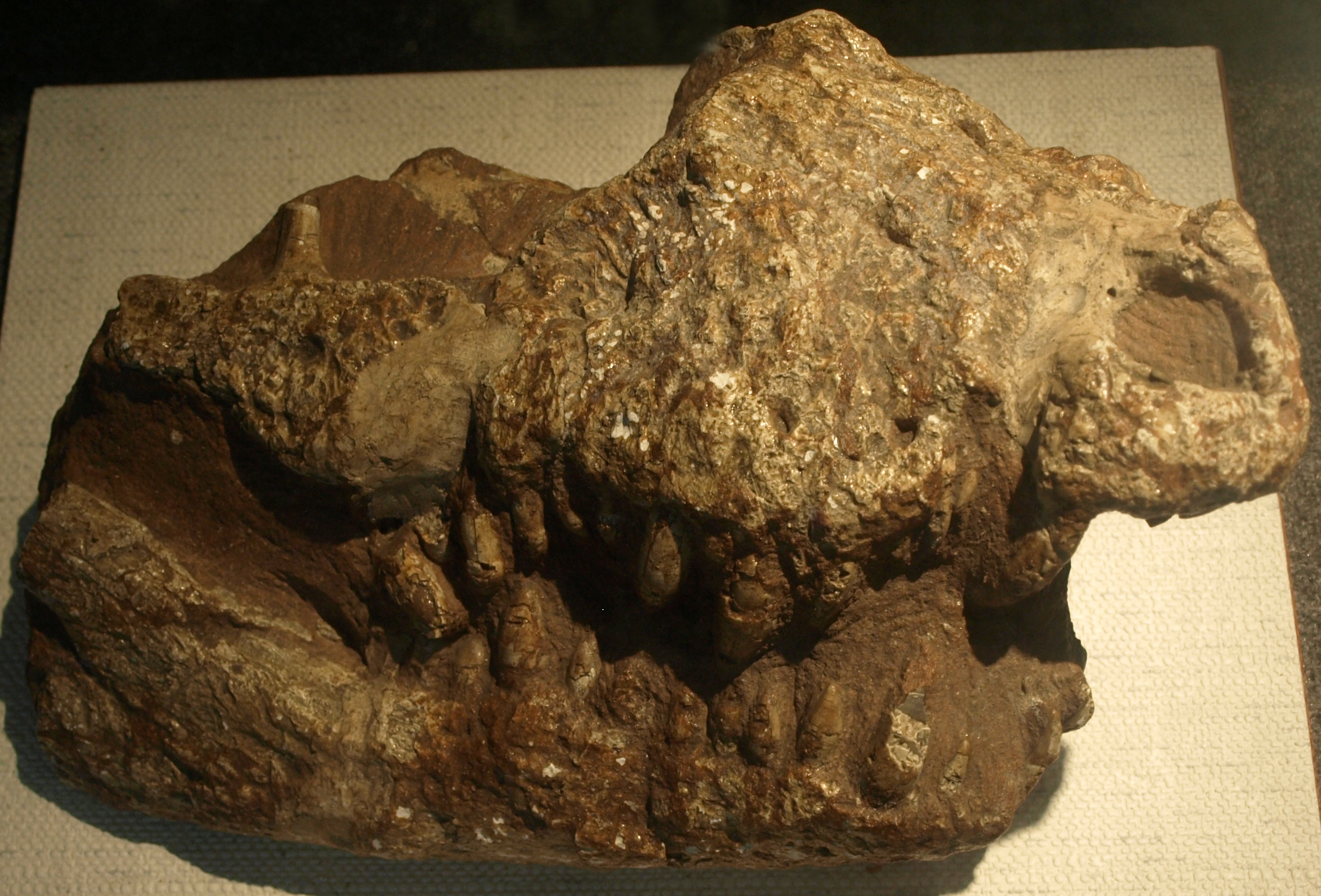
- Partial skull and jaw of Protoalligator huiningensis, on display at the Paleozoological Museum of China

Scientific classification
- Kingdom: Animalia
- Phylum: Chordata
- Class: Reptilia
- Clade: Archosauria
- Order: Crocodilia
- Superfamily: Alligatoroidea
- Clade: Globidonta
- Clade: †Orientalosuchina
- Genus: †Protoalligator; Wang, Sullivan & Liu, 2016

Species
- †P. huiningensis (Young, 1982)

Synonyms
- Eoalligator huiningensis Young, 1982 (type)

= Protoalligator =

Protoalligator Temporal range: Paleocene Middle Paleocene

Extinct genus of reptiles

Protoalligator is an extinct genus of alligatoroid from the Paleocene Wanghudun Formation of China. It was first described as a species of Eoalligator in 1982 before being placed in its own genus in 2016. The name, which translates to "first alligator", was meant to carry on the same meaning as that of Eoalligator ("dawn alligator") as the latter was thought to be synonymous with another crocodilian by the team describing it. Recent studies have suggested that Protoalligator was part of an early radiation of alligatoroids endemic to Asia known as orientalosuchins, though not all studies agree with it being placed within this group nor with orientalosuchins being alligatoroids in the first place. Protoalligator is a monotypic genus, containing only the type species: Protoalligator huiningensis.

== History and naming ==
The remains of Protoalligator huiningensis were first discovered in 1966 by a geological survey team in Huaining County of the Anhui Province, China, specifically in sediments regarded as part of the Upper Wanghudun Formation. They were subsequently described as a species of Eoalligator by Yang Zhongjian (also known as C.C. Young) in 1982 based on the single partial skull found. Young had erected Eoalligator in 1964, though as noted by later researchers was not especially thorough, assigning a plethora of material to the type species Eoalligator chunyii without proper preparation or comparison with the chosen holotype. Similar problems affected Eoalligator huiningensis, who Young had established without explicitly comparing it to E. chunyii of the genus in the diagnosis. This would come to create some issues later, when Yan-Yin Wang, Corwin Sullivan and Jun Liu noted that certain specimen of Eoalligator chunyii shared several features with Asiatosuchus nanlingensis, which Young had named in the same 1964 study. Wang, Sullivan and Liu addressed this issue by publishing a comprehensive revision of the three crocodilians in 2016, concluding that Eoalligator chunyii was a junior synonym of A. nanlingensis. However, the team still found Eoalligator huiningensis to be sufficiently distinct from Young's other taxa and, as a consequence, placed it in a newly formed genus which they named Protoalligator. In 2018 however, further analysis of the bones of A. nanlingensis and Eoalligator did show that the two were separate taxa after all, though Protoalligator nonetheless remained a distinct genus in its own right, supported in part due to the continued hypothesis of one being an alligatoroid and the other being a crocodyloid. Not long after, in 2019, several Asian crocodilians were placed in the newly named clade Orientalosuchina, among them both Protoalligator and Eoalligator. Orientalosuchina, as initially defined, aligned more closely with the placement of Protoalligator among early alligatoroids. Even though this meant that Protoalligator and Eoalligator were once again close relatives rather than falling into entirely different groups of crocodilians, subsequent authors continued following Wang and colleagues in retaining them as two separate taxa distinguished in their anatomy.

The name Protoalligator translates to "first alligator" and was chosen specifically to retain the same meaning as Eoalligator ("dawn alligator") as coined by Young in 1964.

== Description ==
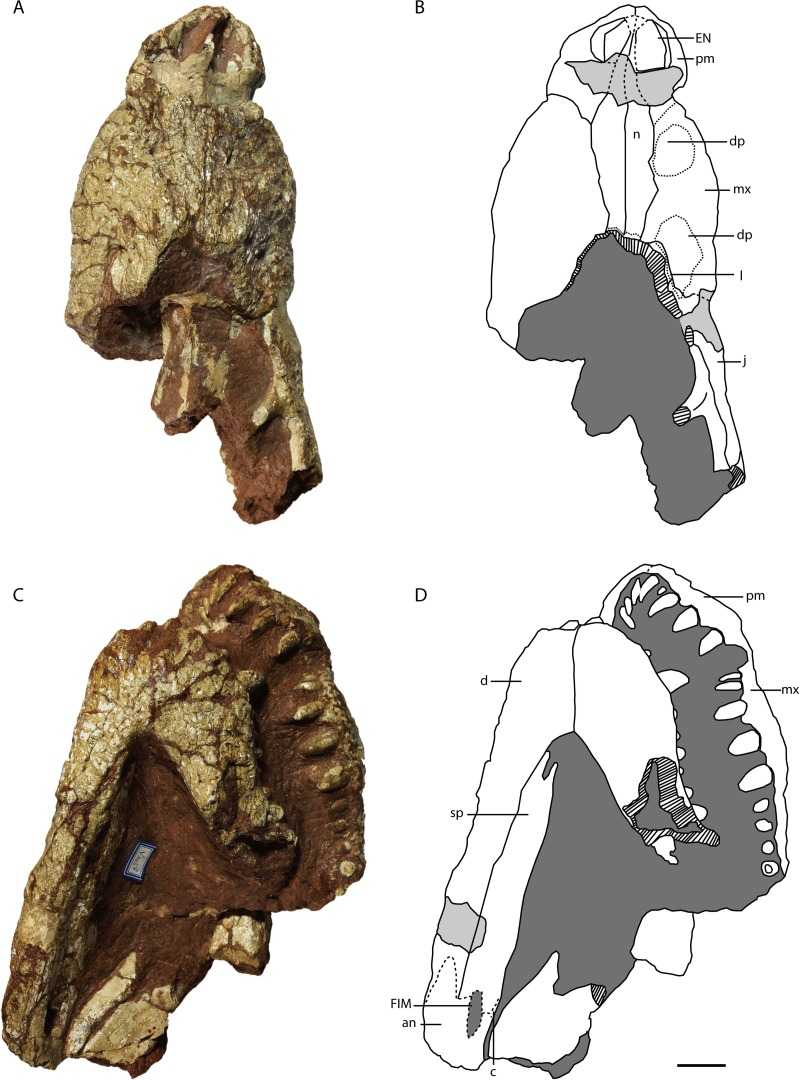
The holotype of Protoalligator as seen from above.

Protoalligator is known from a single specimen, which preserves the front of the snout and parts of the lower jaw, with proportions suggesting that it was relatively short-snouted. The nares are oval in shape and mostly surrounded by the premaxillae. Notably, the surrounding bone appears to have formed a process at the front that would have extended backwards into the opening, though the preserved portion of this process is incomplete in the holotype. The presence of such a process is similar to modern alligators, in which the nares are split in two by a complete nasal bar formed by the premaxillae and the nasal bones, whereas in basal alligatoroids the nares are neither bisected nor do they feature a premaxillary process at all. However, no evidence exists to prove that the nares of Protoalligator were fully bisected as in modern alligators, though they did still clearly extend into the nares as in other orientalosuchins.

Between the premaxilla and the maxilla lies a notch that serves to receive the enlarged fourth tooth of the lower jaw when the mouth was closed as in several other orientalosuchins, though its shape is somewhat exaggerated by the distortion of the holotype. Two depressions can be observed in the surface of the maxilla, which Young listed as one of the distinguishing features of the animal. Though shallow, the depression is relatively wide, stretching from close to the tooth row all the way to the contact between the maxilla and nasal bone, creating an irregular outline. However, the 2016 revision has cast some doubt over the usefulness of this feature, arguing that it may represent an artifact of preservation and even if a genuine anatomical trait is likely of little relevance in regards to taxonomy. A second depression is located further back, overlapping the suture between the maxilla, lacrimal and jugal. The shape of this depression is described as an irregular oval and more distant from the toothrow. Initially, Young suggested that this depression is what remains of the antorbital fenestra, though later research has found this hypothesis to be unsupported, both due to the possibility of it being a preservational artifact, the fact that crocodylians consistently lack this opening even in a reduced state and because the region that is associated with the antorbital fenestra generally does not include participation of the jugal.

The lacrimals are only partially preserved, but there is no sign of the maxilla extending into the space between lacrimal and nasal. The postorbital bar, formed by the jugal, was slightly inset relative to the outer surface of the bone.

=== Lower jaw ===
The mandibular symphysis of Protoalligator, the region of the lower jaw where the two halves connect, extends from the very tip of the mandible to the fifth dentary tooth, which separates it from Asiatosuchus nanlingensis. The symphysis was likely formed entirely by the dentary bones, with no involvement of the splenial, although the very tip of the latter is damaged.

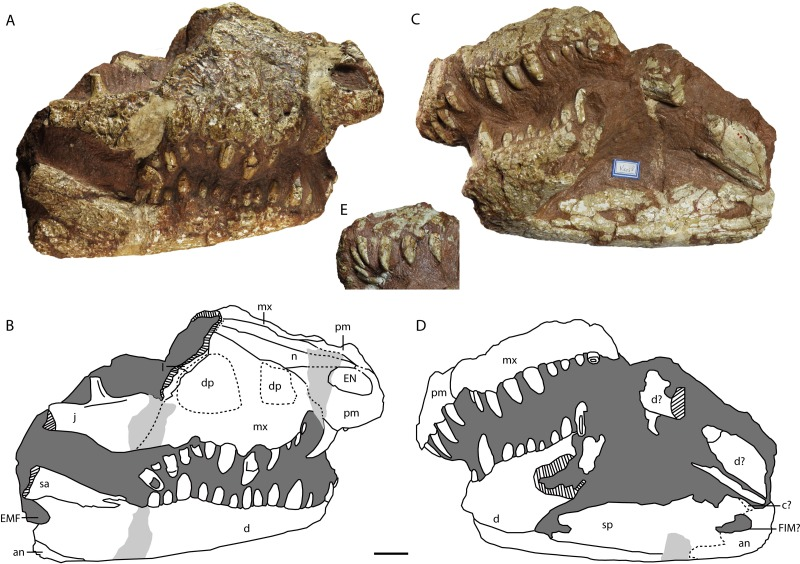
The holotype of Protoalligator in dorsolateral view.

=== Dentition ===
Each premaxilla of Protoalligator bears four teeth, with the fourth being the largest, while in Asiatosuchus nanlingensis the third is the largest. Following the revision of the taxon, 12 teeth are thought to have been present throughout each maxilla. All premaxillary and the first two maxillary teeth are described as small and slender, though within the maxilla the teeth show a clear tend of size increase from the third to the fifth, with the latter being the largest maxillary tooth alongside the sixth. Subsequent teeth are shorter and blunter, even described as bulbous, though teeth ten to twelve are slightly larger than the fourth. Based on the right dentary, each half of the lower jaw would have contained at least 14 teeth. The first two are noted for facing straight up rather than being tilted somewhat forwards and the fourth is the largest, sliding neatly into the notch between premaxilla and maxilla. The eleventh dentary tooth is also noted for its greater size. With the exception of the enlarged fourth dentary tooth, all other teeth of the lower jaw would have occluded medially to those of the upper jaw, giving the animal an overbite.

== Phylogeny ==
Protoalligator has been historically considered to be an alligatoroid as suggested by the name, a placement that was also supported following the 2016 revision, though in the case of the latter it was placed in a large polytomy at the base of Globidonta. A better resolved phylogenetic position was recovered with the recognition of Orientalosuchina. Studies following Massonne and recovering a monophyletic Orientalosuchina generally find Protoalligator to be an early-diverging member of the clade. The 2019 study found it in a polytomy with Eoalligator and Jiangxisuchus, while the descriptions of Dongnanosuchus and Eurycephalosuchus find it as the second most basal orientalosuchin, branching from the rest of the group after Krabisuchus.

- - Alligatoroidea
    - †Leidyosuchus
    - - †Deinosuchus
      - †Diplocynodon
      - Globidonta
        - †Orientalosuchina
          - †Krabisuchus siamogallicus
          - - †Protoalligator huiningensis
            - - †Orientalosuchus naduongenis
              - †Dongnanosuchus hsui
              - †Eurycephalosuchus gannanensis
              - - †Jiangxisuchus nankangensis
                - †Eoalligator chunyii
        - Alligatoridae

Notably, though Protoalligator was initially erected to account for the fact that Wang and colleagues recovered Eoalligator as a crocodyloid and possible synonym of Asiatosuchus nanlingensis, later studies including those of Massonne repeatedly recovered both of them as distinct yet closely related animals. The synonymity between Eoalligator and A. nanlingensis has come to be disregarded by 2018, with additional evidence coming to light that clearly distinguishes both forms. Nevertheless, the authors maintained that Protoalligator represented an alligatoroid and Eoalligator a crocodyloid (specifically a crocodyline), though this study was published before Orientalosuchina was coined by Massonne and colleagues.

However, even disregarding studies published prior to the naming of the clade, not all studies find Protoalligator as a member of Orientalosuchina. While Chabrol et al. 2024 managed to find several orientalosuchins clade with each other, both phylogenetic analysis of their study found Protoalligator as a non-orientalosuchin alligatoroid. Ristevski et al. 2023 meanwhile recovered two phylogenetic trees (out of eight) in which orientalosuchins were placed within the family Mekosuchinae, however like Chabrol and colleagues, Ristevski's team did not find Protoalligator to be among them.

== Paleobiology ==
The only known specimen of Protoalligator has been recovered from the Wanghudun Formation, which is thought to date to the middle Paleocene and crops out within the Qianshan Basin of China. The Lower Member as well as the lower part of the Upper Member of this formation are thought to correlate with the Shanghu Formation and Shizikou Formation and correspond to the Shanghuan Asian Land Mammal Age while the upper part of the Upper Member seems to date to the Nongshanian. Yuan-Qing Wang and colleagues identified the strata that Protoalligator was recovered from as the lower Wanghudun Formation, whereas Yan-Yin Wang and colleagues state that the fossils came from the upper part of the formation. According to the former, the Dinghuawu locality that yielded Protoalligator also preserved the fossils of the turtle Anhuichelys, which is widespread across both members of the formation. Both members preserve the squamate Qianshanosaurus as well as a variety of early mammals like anagaloids (related to rodents and lagomorphs), pantodonts and tillodontians. Exclusive to the Upper Member are members of Simplicidentata, Mimotonida and Didymoconida. Carnivores are represented by the mesonychid Yantanglestes in the Lower Member and the bird Qianshanornis as well as the carnivoran Pappictidops in the Upper Member.

The Qianshan basin also preserves other crocodylomorphs, such as the crocodyloid Qianshanosuchus, which is only known from juvenile remains recovered from the Upper Member. The enigmatic Wanosuchus is also known from the Paleocene of the Qianshan Basin, though its locality of origin is not known.
