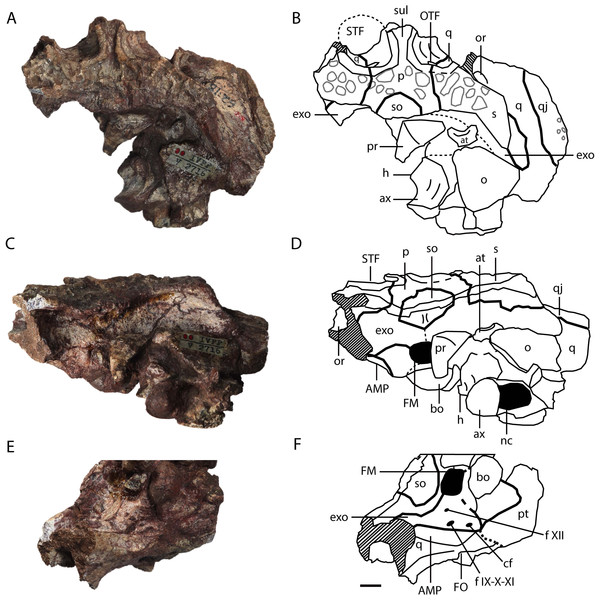
- The skull table of Eoalligator chunyii.

Scientific classification
- Kingdom: Animalia
- Phylum: Chordata
- Class: Reptilia
- Order: Crocodylia
- Superfamily: Alligatoroidea
- Clade: Globidonta
- Clade: †Orientalosuchina
- Genus: †Eoalligator; Young, 1964

Type species
- †Eoalligator chunyii Young, 1964

= Eoalligator =

Eoalligator Temporal range: Maastrichtian–Paleocene

Extinct genus of large reptiles

Eoalligator is an extinct genus of alligatoroid crocodilian known from fragmentary remains that have been recovered from Late Cretaceous to Paleocene sediments of China. Fossils of the type and only species, Eoalligator chunyii, were first discovered in 1964 and described alongside the bones of Asiatosuchus nanlingensis. While one 2016 study eventually suggested that the two might in fact represent the same animal, more recent work has been published arguing that the two are in fact different. At one point a second species was also named, but has since placed in its own genus, Protoalligator. The relationship between Eoalligator and other crocodilians has repeatedly shifted: it was initially interpreted as an alligatorine, then for some time as a type of crocodyloid before being placed in the clade Orientalosuchina, a group of crocodilians with disputed affinities endemic to Asia during the Cretaceous and Paleogene.

== History and naming ==
=== Early history ===
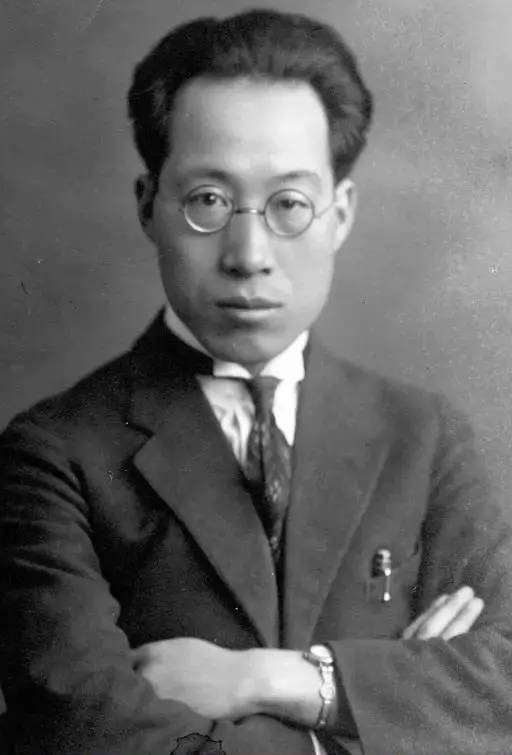
Eoalligator was named by C. C. Young in 1964 alongside the crocodyloid Asiatosuchus nanlingensis.

The genus Eoalligator was named in 1964 by Yang Zhongjian (also known as C.C. Young) based on assorted fossil material collected in the Guangdong Province, with Eoalligator chunyii serving as the type and only species. The same study also described the large crocodyloid Asiatosuchus nanlingensis. The material assigned to Eoalligator chunyii by Young came exclusively from Nanxiong County, specifically three localities (identified as L1, L2 and L3) all within 8 km (5.0 mi) of one another. These localities correspond to the Zhenshui Formation (Late Cretaceous), strata thought to date to the K-PG boundary, and the Shanghu Formation (Lower Paleocene). The holotype from locality L1 consists of several fossil specimens that may not necessarily represent a single individual. In addition to the skull remains, neck vertebrae and lower jaw that formed the backbone of the original description, the material also included additional skull remains later found to represent a second individual. Given the fragmentary state of the other fossils, it is not clear whether they belong to one of these two individuals or a different one entirely. Additionally, not all of the material assigned to Eoalligator by Young was described and some was not even fully prepared at the time of the paper's publication. In 1982 Young erected a second species, Eoalligator huiningensis, based on material found in the Wanghudun Formation of the Anhui Province.

=== Revisions and revival ===
Young's concept of Eoalligator suffered from numerous issues that were discussed in detail by Yan-Yin Wang, Corwin Sullivan and Jun Liu in 2016 in a study aiming to illuminate the status of the two species of Eoalligator as well as Asiatosuchus nanlingensis. They took note of the fact that not all of the material referred to Eoalligator by Young was fully prepared and that not all of it was thoroughly described to begin with. Furthermore, their work has shown that not all the material can confidently be identified as a crocodilian in the first place, with some instead representing turtle remains. Even among the crocodilian material, it is unclear how much can truly be assigned to Eoalligator, as much of it consisted of isolated material not directly associated with the diagnostic skull remains, which represent at least two individuals. The team noted that the remains of Asiatosuchus nanlingensis and Eoalligator chunyii overlap in range both geographically and stratigraphically, yet Young never distinguished the two from each other. They further argued that both taxa share certain anatomical features, prompting them to propose that they were synonyms. Given that Asiatosuchus nanlingensis was described in an earlier section of Young's publication, Eoalligator chunyii was declared a junior synonym of the former. The team also questioned the referral of E. huiningensis to the genus, highlighting that Young did not compare E. huiningensis to E. chunyii when describing it and that the two did not share any diagnostic traits. Instead, they assigned Eoalligator huiningensis to the new genus Protoalligator.

Not all of these changes lasted. Only two years later a team led by Xiao-Chun Wu and including Yan-Yin Wang, who had worked in the 2016 paper, published another study re-validating Eoalligator chunyii as a taxon distinct from Asiatosuchus nanlingensis. This conclusion was reached after a more detailed comparison between the two animals, revealing new distinguishing features and leading to the diagnoses of the two taxa being revised. The study further noted that one particular lower jaw element previously assigned to Asiatosuchus nanlingensis is a better fit for Eoalligator chunyii, extending the range of the latter to what is dubbed Locality 5 (Paleocene). Of the material originally assigned to Eoalligator chunyii, the authors retained parts the type material from the Shanghu Formation, a jaw element from the Zhenshui Formation and the incomplete left mandible recovered from the site that seems to correspond to the K-PG boundary, though they abstained from covering the numerous postcranial fossils previously referred to the animal.

Subsequent papers generally followed this assessment, keeping both Eoalligator chunyii and Protoalligator huiningensis as two distinct species in their own genera, though the 2019 recognition of Orientalosuchina by Tobias Massonne and colleagues saw them placed in the same clade. This contrasts with the previous studies by Wang and Wu, which regarded them as a crocodyloid and an alligatoroid respectively.

=== Etymology ===
The name Eoalligator roughly translates to "dawn alligator". The species name references Chun-yi Wang, who Young had chosen to honor due to his work at Nanhsiung from 1962 to 1963.

== Description ==
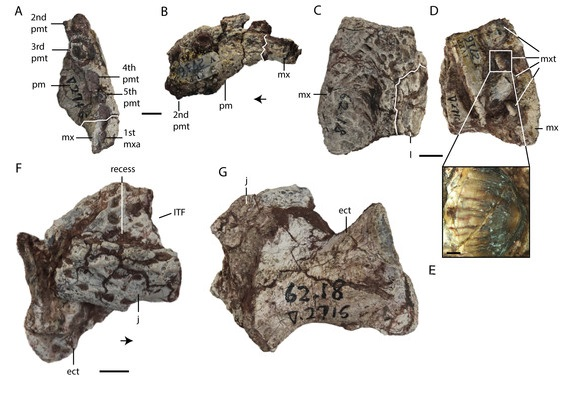
Eoalligator is chiefly known from a handful of skull fragments.

Like other orientalosuchins Eoalligator possessed a short and blunt snout that shares characteristics with both crocodyloids and alligatoroids, contributing to its unclear position within Crocodilia. The lower margin of the upper jaw displays a clear pattern of concave and convex regions following the toothrow, a condition known as festooning. Wang and colleagues describe the curvature of the premaxilla as being similar to that of the saltwater crocodile, whereas the curvature is much shallower in the Chinese alligator. The contact between the premaxilla and maxilla runs through a fossa located just behind the last premaxillary tooth, which serves to receive an enlarged fourth dentary tooth when the jaws are closed, partially hiding it as in modern alligators and differing from the notch seen in several other orientalosuchins.

The quadratojugal would have formed part of the infratemporal fenestra alongside the jugal bone, and formed a spine that would have protruded into the opening. This is actually a plesiomorphic condition among crocodilians and also appears in modern gharials, crocodiles and dwarf crocodiles, whereas its displaced in alligatorines. Towards the back of the skull the quadratojugal comes in contact part of the lateral hemicondyle of the quadrate bone, the outer of the two hemicondyles. The medial condyle, which is positioned closer to the midline of the skull, is described as being expanded similar to Tomistoma, however the two are still considered to be similar in size by Wu et al., contrary to the description of Wang and colleagues.

The parietal forms the central part of the skull table, located between the supratemporal fenestra and the squamosal bones. It is shaped like an inverted Y, with a narrow process between the fenestra and two prongs diverging from the midline towards the back of the skull table due to the presence of a dorsally exposed supraoccipital. The surface of the parietal is dominated by a narrow trench between the fenestra, whose rims are raised.

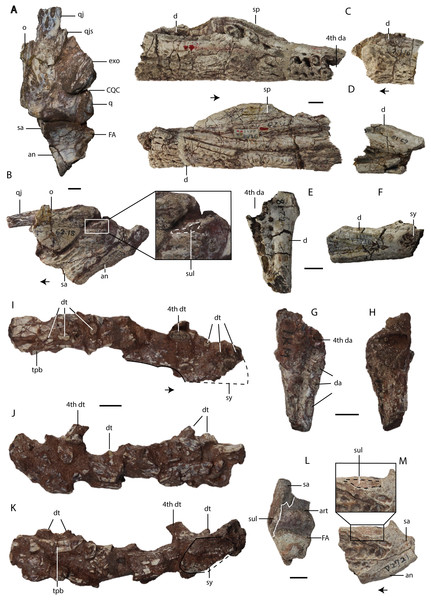
Several lower jaw fossils are also known and can be differentiated from those of Asiatosuchus nanlingensis by the much more strongly curved toothrow.

=== Lower jaw ===
Matching the sinuous margin of the upper jaw, the lower jaw displays the same gentle curvature that sets it apart from the straight jaws of animals like the modern gharial. This feature helps set apart the lower jaw of Eoalligator from that of Asiatosuchus nanlingensis, which has been interpreted as having possessed a more elongated snout with an almost straight dental margin. The mandibular symphysis, the region at the front of the lower jaw where both mandibles meet, is short and extends only to the level of the fourth tooth of the dentary. The splenial approaches the symphysis, but stops just shy of actually participating in this region. The upper edge of the surangular is of the same height as the ridge that sits towards the back of the mandibular fossa, thereby hiding the latter when looking at the lower jaw from the side. The surangular furthermore preserves a depression immediately beside the fossa, a trait shared by Asiatosuchus nanlingensis. This feature is unique for these two crocodilians, though it has been noted that a smaller sulcus can be seen in Diplocynodon, although in the European genus its moved further towards the back of the mandible. It has also been noted that this sulcus might be variable across specimens of different ages, as some remains of Eoalligator preserve a much more prominent depression, suggesting that it might grow less and less prominent as the animal grows. The surangular also covers the front of the retroarticular process, although its true extent remains unknown due to damage suffered by the fossil. The articular, like the splenial, is primarily visible when looking at the inner wall of the mandible, with most of it being covered by the surangularand angular bone towards the outside. Its contact with the surangular is described as running anteroposteriorly, meaning from the front of the lower jaw to the back, and passes through the mandibular fossa.

=== Dentition ===
A minimum of four tooth sockets are preserved in each premaxilla of Eoalligator, however as noted in the 2016 revision, the examined specimen was damaged towards the very front of the snout, likely meaning that the front most alveolus was destroyed prior to the fossils discovery. This would mean that Eoalligator possessed a total of five premaxillary teeth per premaxilla. Of these, the third is the largest and the fifth is the smallest. The exact number of maxillary teeth is unknown, but Wang and colleagues describe them as blunt with smooth cutting edges and some compression, setting them apart from the very bulbous teeth of most early members of Globidonta.

The exact number of dentary teeth is similarly unknown, though Wang and colleagues identify some alveoli in one dentary as the fourth to the seventeenth, with more likely to have been present before and after. Young initially gave an estimated count of 23 dentary teeth. As in other orientalosuchins and many crocodilians in general, the fourth appears to have been the largest and would have slid into the fossa present between the premaxilla and maxilla. The 11th and 12th teeth of the lower jaw are also described as enlarged, though not as much as the fourth.

=== Size ===
Eoalligator has been described as moderately-sized.

== Phylogeny ==
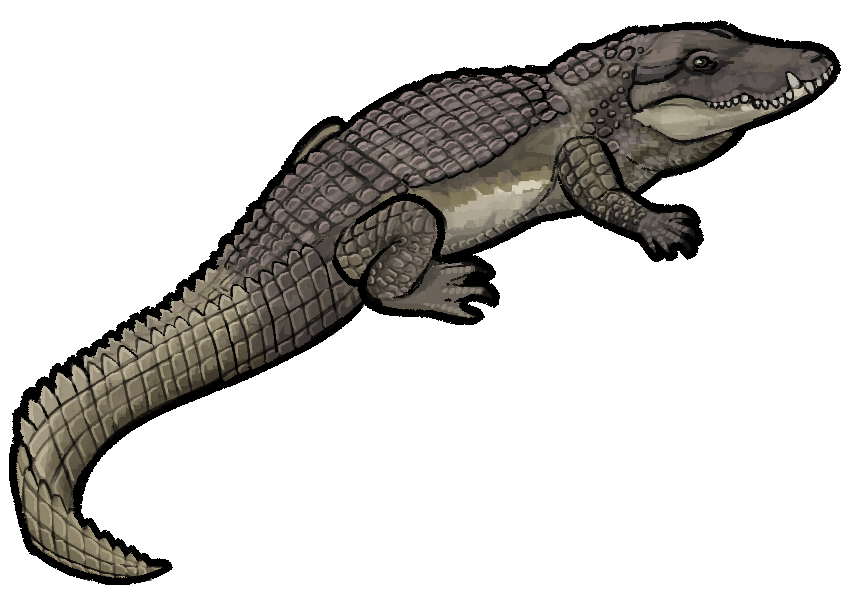
Jiangxisuchus, another crocodilian from the Cretaceous of China, is typically recovered as the closest relative to Eoalligator.

While Eoalligator was originally classified as an extinct relative of alligators, the 2016 revision by Wang and colleagues recovered it as a member of Crocodylidae and as the sister taxon to Asiatosuchus nanlingensis, which they took as support for their hypothesis that the two represented a single species. However, a subsequent study by Wu et al. disagreed with the synonymy of the two, although they agreed in classifying E. chunyii as a crocodyloid. In both instances the phylogenetic trees were only poorly resolved, with the 2016 paper featuring a large polytomy consisting of the Eoalligator - A. nanlingensis clade, Mekosuchinae, various members of Osteolaeminae and a clade formed by Mecistops and Crocodylus. The 2018 phylogeny did not fare much better, with Eoalligator being placed in yet another polytomy within Crocodylinae alongside the then unnamed Maoming alligator, various osteolaemines and Crocodylus. A better resolved phylogenetic tree featuring Eoalligator was eventually recovered by Li and colleagues in 2019, who found it to be closely related not to Asiatosuchus nanlingensis but to the Cretaceous crocodilian Jiangxisuchus. The phylogenetic tree recovered by this study is showcased below.

- Crocodilia
  - Gavialoidea
  - - †Borealosuchus
    - - †Planocraniidae
      - Brevirostres
        - Alligatoroidea
        - Crocodyloidea
          - †"Asiatosuchus" germanicus
          - - †Albertosuchus
            - - †Prodiplocynodon
              - - - †Eoalligator
                  - †Jiangxisuchus
                - - - †Crocodylus depressifrons
                    - †Crocodylus affinis
                    - †Asiatosuchus grangeri
                  - - - †Brachyuranochampsa
                      - †Crocodylus acer
                    - - Tomistominae
                      - Crocodylinae

Eoalligator returned to its original placement as an alligatoroid with the recognition of Orientalosuchina later that year, named by Massonne et al. alongside their description of Orientalosuchus. In their study, the team suggested that several Cretaceous to Paleogene crocodilians from Asia actually formed a monophyletic group of early alligatoroids. This clade was initially created to contain Orientalosuchus, Krabisuchus, Jiangxisuchus, Protoalligator and Eoalligator, with the latter three all being placed in a basal polytomy. The concept of Orientalosuchina was later expanded following the description of Dongnanosuchus (previously only known as the Maoming alligator) and Eurycephalosuchus. In these studies, Eoalligator was again placed as the sister taxon to Jiangxisuchus, similar to the results of Li and colleagues. The most recent phylogeny featuring Eoalligator as an orientalosuchin is shown below.

- - Alligatoroidea
    - †Leidyosuchus
    - - †Deinosuchus
      - †Diplocynodon
      - Globidonta
        - †Orientalosuchina
          - †Krabisuchus siamogallicus
          - - †Protoalligator huiningensis
            - - †Orientalosuchus naduongenis
              - †Dongnanosuchus hsui
              - †Eurycephalosuchus gannanensis
              - - †Jiangxisuchus nankangensis
                - †Eoalligator chunyii
        - Alligatoridae

This interpretation is not uncontested. Some doubt over Massonne's idea of Orientalosuchina was cast by a 2024 study on the osteology Crocodylus palaeindicus, which remarked on how the placement of the clade within Alligatoroidea might not be wholly supported and that they could represent a group more closely allied with crocodyloids. However, Eoalligator was not specifically featured in the study's phylogeny. Eoalligator did make an appearance in the 2023 review of Australasian crocodylomorphs published by Jorgo Ristevski and colleagues. Though most of their phylogenetic analysis recovered a traditional topology for the clade Mekosuchinae (Cenozoic crocodiles primarily found in Australia), two of their other results stand out since they place members of Orientalosuchina as deeply-nested mekosuchines between the more robust members of the clade and the smaller dwarf forms. The results somewhat mirror the internal topology of Shan et al. (2021) and Wu et al. (2022) in that Eoalligator clades as the sister taxon of Jiangxisuchus, with Orientalosuchus and Krabisuchus as more basal forms. Dongnanosuchus meanwhile falls outside of Orientalosuchina, closer to small mekosuchines like Ultrastenos (then still known as "Baru" huberi). However, support for this particular topology is acknowledged as being relatively weak, though deserving of further study.

- Crocodilia
  - Alligatoroidea
  - - †Planocraniidae
    - - - †Prodiplocynodon
        - - - †"Crocodylus" affinis
            - †"Crocodylus" depressifrons
          - - †"Crocodylus" acer
            - †Brachyuranochampsa
          - Longirostres
            - Gavialoidea
            - Crocodyloidea
      - - †Asiatosuchus germanicus
        - Mekosuchinae
          - - †Kalthifrons
            - - - †Quinkana meboldi
                - - †Quinkana fortirostrum
                  - †Quinkana timara
              - - - †Paludirex gracilis
                  - †Paludirex vincenti
                - - †Baru wickeni
                  - †Baru darrowi
          - - Orientalosuchina
              - †Krabisuchus
              - - †Orientalosuchus
                - - †Jiangxisuchus
                  - †Eoalligator
            - - †Dongnanosuchus
              - - †"Baru" huberi
                - - †Volia
                  - †Trilophosuchus
                  - - †Mekosuchus sanderi
                    - †Mekosuchus whitehunterensis
                    - †Mekosuchus inexpectatus

== Paleobiology ==
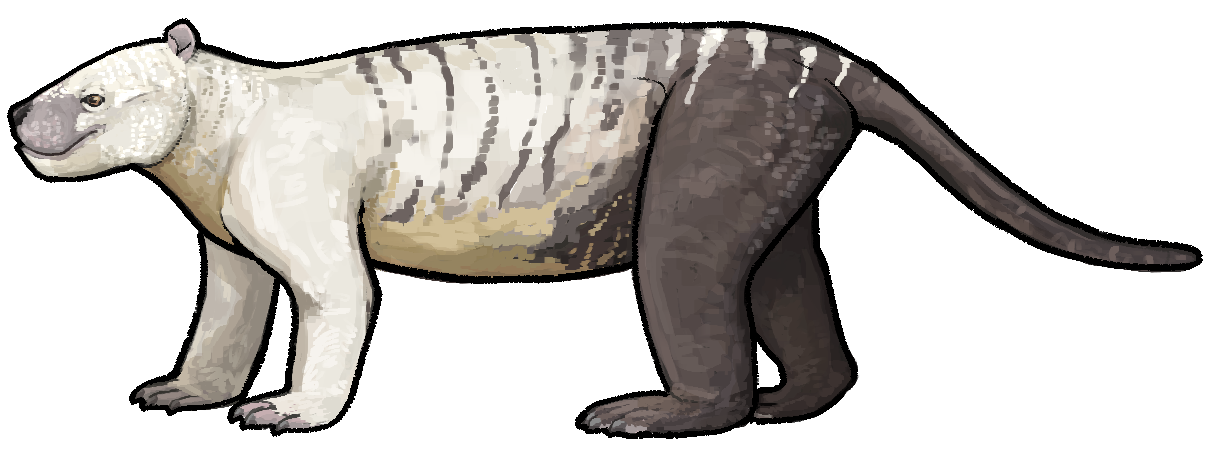
While first appearing in the Cretaceous, Eoalligator survived past the KPG extinction, later coexisting alongside early mammals like anagalids (top) and pantolambdids (bottom).

Material of Eoalligator is known from several localities throughout China's Nanxiong Basin, in sediments deposited both before and after the Cretaceous–Paleogene extinction event that wiped out non-avian dinosaurs. Wang and colleagues specifically identify two formations as having yielded fossil remains of Eoalligator, the Zhenshui Formation, which represents the Cretaceous strata deposited prior to the asteroid impact, and the Shanghu Formation above it, which represents the sediments deposited afterwards during the early Paleocene. The Zhenshui Formation forms the uppermost layer of the Nanxiong Group, also referred to as the Nanxiong Formation by some researchers.

The Maastrichtian Zhenshui Formation was deposited under fluvio-lacustrine conditions, meaning in an environment shaped by rivers or lakes, and has preserved the fossils of dinosaurs and their eggs. The Zhenshui and Shanghu formations have been interpreted as representing alluvial fan or playa mudflat environments that underwent distinct wet and dry periods in a semi-arid climate.

The records of Eoalligator from the Shanghu Formation are younger, having been preserved following the K-PG extinction. The Shanghu Formation is sometimes divided into two members based on their respective mammal faunas, which show distinct differences between lower and upper layers. The lower part of the formation is taxonomically poorer, though it features three different mesonychids including Yantanglestes. The upper Shanghu fauna lacks mesonychids, but instead houses a richer collection of mammals including carnivorans, astigalids, anagalids (such as Linnania), tillodonts (including Huananius) and pantolambdids. The Shanghu Formation seems to be of the same age as at least in part with the Whangudun Formation, the geological unit that has yielded the remains of Protoalligator. This is based on the fact that both the Upper Shanghu and the Whangudun share some of its mammal fauna, notably astigalids and tillodonts.

Eoalligator may have overlapped in its range with Asiatosuchus nanlingensis in the Paleocene, as it has been recovered from the same locality as specimen V2772.2, an incomplete lower jaw of a crocodilian with somewhat elongated jaws. However, the exact identity of this specimen remains uncertain and it is also possible that this longirostrine form represents an as of yet unnamed species that coexisted with Eoalligator.
