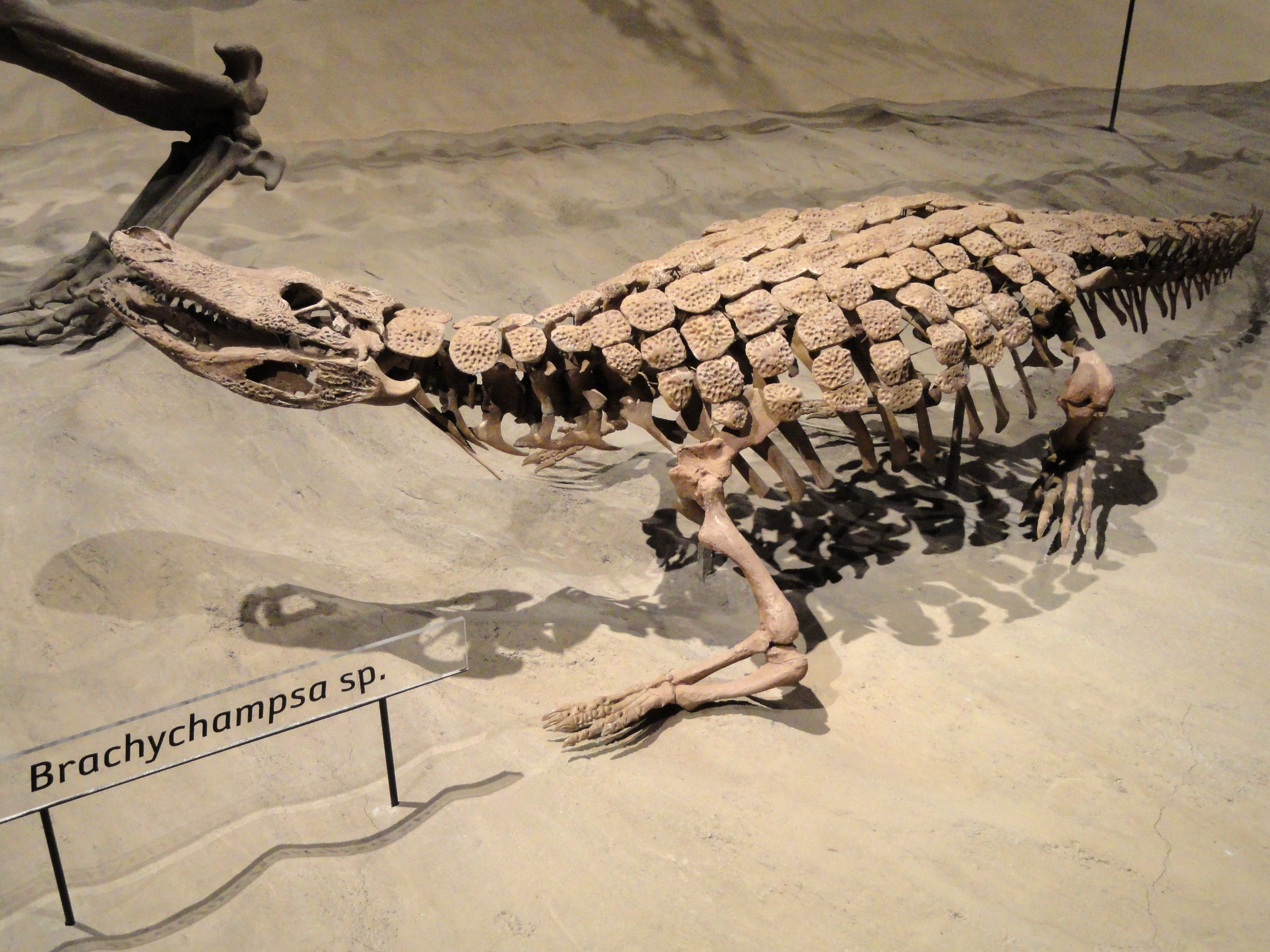
- Brachychampsa sp.

Scientific classification
- Kingdom: Animalia
- Phylum: Chordata
- Class: Reptilia
- Clade: Archosauria
- Order: Crocodilia
- Superfamily: Alligatoroidea
- Clade: Globidonta; Brochu, 1999

Subclades
- †Orientalosuchina; Alligatoridae; †Brachychampsini? Cossette & Tarailo, 2024; †Albertochampsa; †Brachychampsa; †Chrysochampsa; †Stangerochampsa

= Globidonta =

Globidonta Temporal range: Campanian–Present

Clade of reptiles

Globidonta is a clade of alligatoroids that includes alligators, caimans, and closely related extinct forms. It is defined as a stem-based clade including Alligator mississippiensis (the American Alligator) and all forms more closely related to it than to Diplocynodon. The group's fossil range extends back into the Campanian stage of the Late Cretaceous with early alligatoroids such as Albertochampsa and Brachychampsa. Extinct globidontans were particularly common in North America and Eurasia, and their modern range also includes South America.

Basal globidontans are characterized by their blunt snouts and bulbous teeth. Modern globidontans have flattened snouts and more conical teeth, and are seen as more generalized than earlier globidontans. Generalized forms are usually expected to be ancestral to more specialized forms rather than descendants of them, so it is unusual for basal members of the group to appear specialized. This seems to conflict with the "Law of the Unspecialized" first proposed by Edward Drinker Cope in 1894. Under the Law of the Unspecialized, morphological change is always directed toward specialization, and specialized forms can never become "unspecialized" again. This pattern of change, while not seen in globidontans, can be observed in basal members of Alligatoroidea and Crocodyloidea.

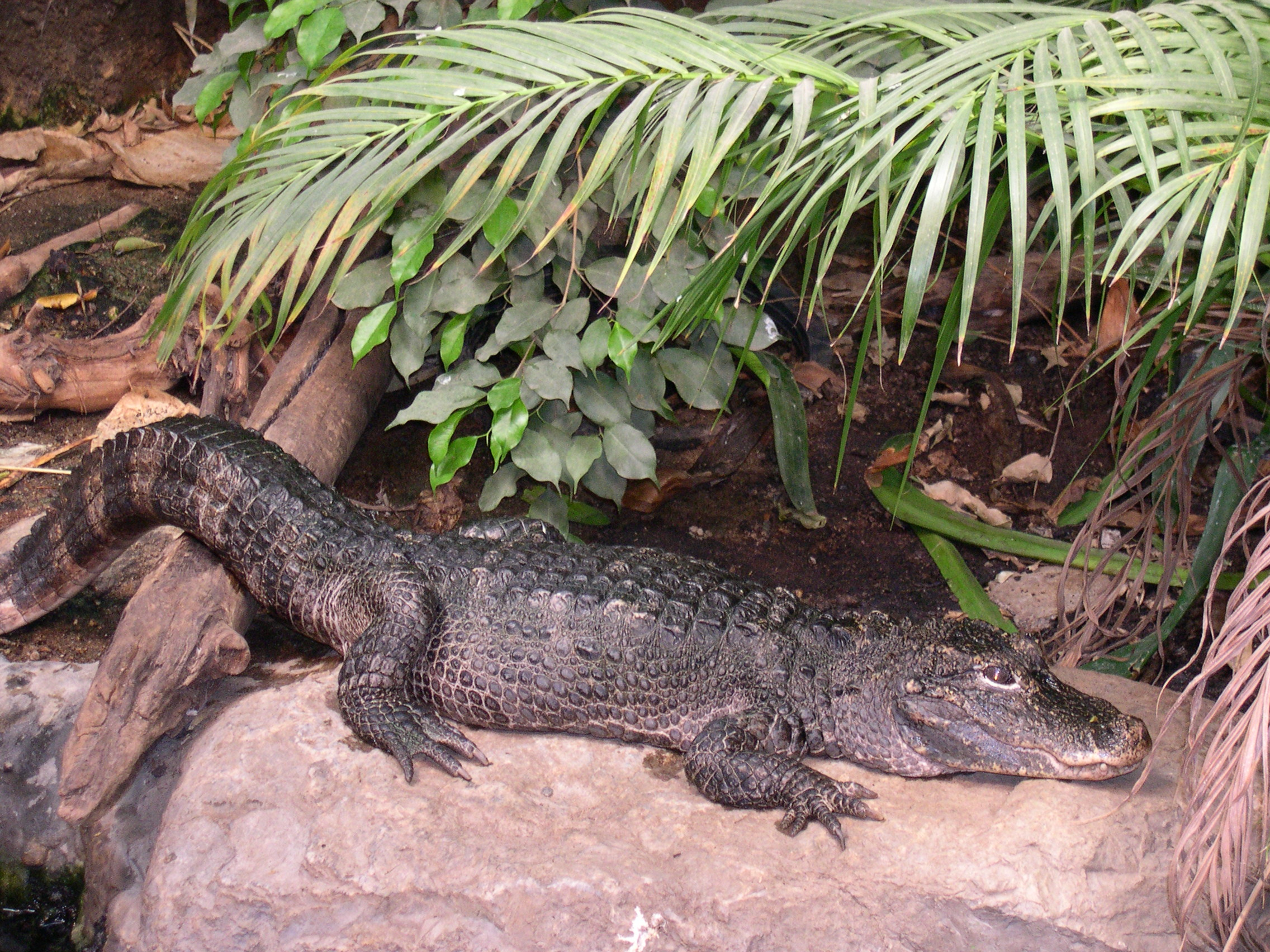
Alligator sinensis, the Chinese Alligator.

Flat-snouted globidontans occurred two times in the evolution of the clade: once in caimans and once in alligators. Alligator sinensis, the Chinese Alligator, has a snout that is somewhat blunt and could be considered specialized. However, its snout is not nearly as blunt as those of more basal globidontans such as Albertachampsa.

If the last common ancestor of Diplocynodon and globidontans was more like Diplocynodon, it would have had a generalized snout shape. It is also possible that the generalized form of Diplocynodon may also have arisen from a specialized blunt-snouted ancestor.

== Phylogenetics ==
The below cladogram shows Globidonta's placement within Crocodylia, based on a 2018 tip dating study by Lee & Yates that simultaneously used morphological, molecular (DNA sequencing), and stratigraphic (fossil age) data.

- Crocodylia (crown group)
  - Alligatoroidea (stem-based group)
    - Leidyosuchus†
    - - Diplocynodontinae†
        Diplocynodon†
      - Globidonta (stem-based group)
        - - Stangerochampsa†
          - Brachychampsa†
        - - Navajosuchus†
          - Alligatoridae (crown group)
            - Caimaninae
              - - Caiman
                - Melanosuchus
              - Paleosuchus
            - Alligatorinae
              Alligator
  - - extinct basal Crocodilians† (including Mekosuchinae†)
    - Longirostres (crown group)
      - Crocodyloidea (stem-based group)
        - extinct basal crocodiles†
        - Crocodylidae (crown group)
      - Gavialoidea (stem-based group)
        - extinct basal Gavialoids†
        - Gavialidae (crown group)
          - Gavialis
          - Tomistoma

Here is a more detailed cladogram of Globidonta from a 2019 Massonne et al. study, with Leidyosuchus included as a member:

- Alligatoroidea
  - Diplocynodontinae†
  - Globidonta
    - Leidyosuchus†
    - - Deinosuchus†
      - - - Navajosuchus†
          - Ceratosuchus†
          - - Stangerochampsa†
            - - Brachychampsa sealeyi†
              - - Brachychampsa montana†
                - Orientalosuchina†
                  - Eoalligator†
                  - Jiangxisuchus†
                  - Protoalligator†
                  - - Orientalosuchus†
                    - Krabisuchus†
        - Alligatoridae
          - Alligatorinae
          - Caimaninae

Some studies have alternatively found many members of Globidonta to instead be basal members of the crown group Alligatoridae, within either of the stem groups Alligatorinae or Caimaninae: specifically Navajosuchus and Ceratosuchus as basal members of Alligatorinae, and Stangerochampsa and Brachychampsa as basal members of Caimaninae. Adam Cossette and David Tarailo in 2024 recovered a clade within Caimaninae comprising Brachychampsa and its close relatives. They named this clade Brachychampsini, defining it as "the largest clade of alligatorids more closely related to Brachychampsa montana than to Caiman crocodilus (the Spectacled caiman) or Alligator mississippiensis (the American alligator).
