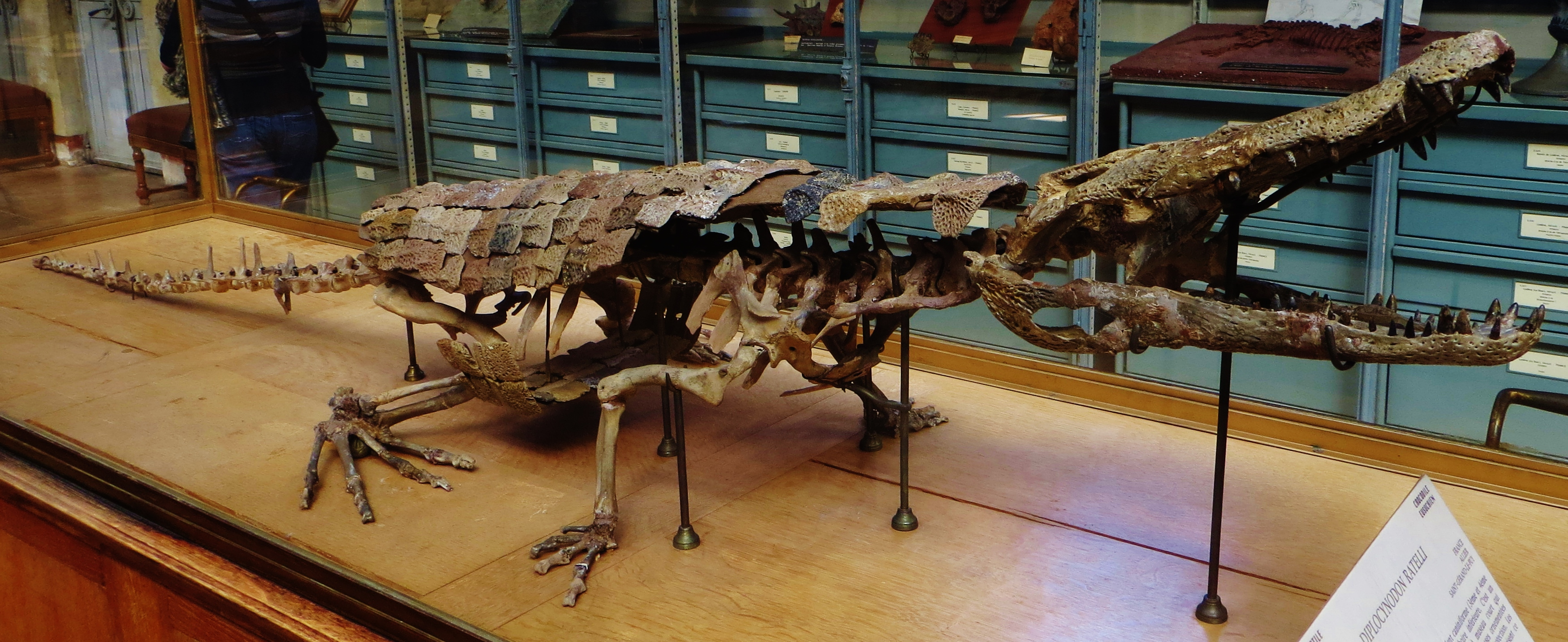
- Diplocynodon ratelii

Scientific classification
- Kingdom: Animalia
- Phylum: Chordata
- Class: Reptilia
- Clade: Pseudosuchia
- Clade: Crocodylomorpha
- Clade: Metasuchia
- Clade: Neosuchia
- Clade: Eusuchia
- Genus: †Diplocynodon; Pomel, 1847

Species
- †D. darwini (Ludvig, 1877); †D. deponiae (Frey, Laemmert & Riess, 1987); †D. elavericus Martin, 2010; †D. gervaisi; †D. hantoniensis (Wood, 1846); †D. levantinicum Huene & Nikoloff, 1963; †D. kochi (Venczel & Codrea, 2022); †D. muelleri (Kälin, 1936); †D. ratelii Pomel, 1847 (type); †D. tormis; †D. ungeri (Prangner, 1845)

Synonyms
- Baryphracta Frey, Laemmert & Riess, 1987; Enneodon Pranger, 1845; Hispanochampsa Kälin, 1936; Saurocainus

= Diplocynodon =

Diplocynodon Temporal range: Paleocene - Middle Miocene, 59.2–13.8 Ma

Extinct genus of reptiles

Diplocynodon is an extinct genus of eusuchian, either an alligatoroid crocodilian or a stem-group crocodilian, that lived during the Paleocene to Middle Miocene in Europe. Some species may have reached lengths of 3 metres (9.8 ft), while others probably did not exceed 1 metre (3.3 ft). The largest species D.hantoniensis measured 5.9 m (19.5 ft) in length. They are almost exclusively found in freshwater environments. The various species are thought to have been opportunistic aquatic predators.

In the nineteenth century, D. steineri was named from Styria, Austria and D. styriacus was named from Austria and France. A third Austrian species, Enneodon ungeri, was placed in its own genus. The Austrian and French species of Diplocynodon were synonymized with E. ungeri in 2011, and because the name Diplocynodon has priority over Enneodon, the species is now called D. ungeri. Other genera have recently been found to be synonymous with Diplocynodon. Hispanochampsa muelleri of Spain was determined to be synonymous with Diplocynodon in 2006, and Baryphracta deponaie of Germany was confirmed to be synonymous with Diplocynodon in 2012.

Well preserved specimens have been found in the Messel Pit and the Geiseltal lignite deposit in Germany. Most articulated Diplocynodon specimens from these localities contain gastroliths. In the Eocene epoch, the German sites were either a swampy freshwater lake (Messel Pit) or a peat bog swamp (Geiseltal).

== Species ==
Species
Species	Age	Location	Unit	Notes	Images
D. darwini	Lutetian	Germany	Messel pit	All specimens are from Messel pit of Germany. Synonyms are: D. ebertsi and D. hallense.	D. darwini from Messel pit, Hesse, Germany, 48 million years old Skull of D. hantoniensis Diplocynodon cf. ratelii
D. deponaie	Middle Eocene	Germany	Messel pit	Synonyms are: Baryphracta deponaie.	D. darwini from Messel pit, Hesse, Germany, 48 million years old Skull of D. hantoniensis Diplocynodon cf. ratelii
D. elavericus	Middle Priabonian	France	Domérat	All specimens came from Allier, Massif Central of France.	D. darwini from Messel pit, Hesse, Germany, 48 million years old Skull of D. hantoniensis Diplocynodon cf. ratelii
D. gervaisi	Earliest Rupelian	France	Ronzon	Synonyms are: Saurocainus gervaisi.	D. darwini from Messel pit, Hesse, Germany, 48 million years old Skull of D. hantoniensis Diplocynodon cf. ratelii
D. hantoniensis	Early Priabonian	United Kingdom	Headon Hill Formation	All specimens came from Hordwell, southern England. D. cf. hantoniensis is known from the Oligocene of Dordogne, France.	D. darwini from Messel pit, Hesse, Germany, 48 million years old Skull of D. hantoniensis Diplocynodon cf. ratelii
D. levantinicum	Oligocene (Chattian)	Bulgaria	Maritsa Formation		D. darwini from Messel pit, Hesse, Germany, 48 million years old Skull of D. hantoniensis Diplocynodon cf. ratelii
D. kochi	Eocene (Priabonian)	Romania	Cluj Limestone Formation		D. darwini from Messel pit, Hesse, Germany, 48 million years old Skull of D. hantoniensis Diplocynodon cf. ratelii
D. muelleri	Middle Rupelian	Spain	El Talladell	More than 100 are known, all from Lleida Province, Catalonia. Synonyms are: Hispanochampsa muelleri, D. guerini and D. marini.	D. darwini from Messel pit, Hesse, Germany, 48 million years old Skull of D. hantoniensis Diplocynodon cf. ratelii
D. ratelii	Middle Aquitanian*; Late Eocene to Early Miocene	France	Saint-Gérand-le-Puy*	D. ratelii is the type species of Diplocynodon. Most of the specimens came from Allier, Massif Central of France. Synonyms are: D. gracile.	D. darwini from Messel pit, Hesse, Germany, 48 million years old Skull of D. hantoniensis Diplocynodon cf. ratelii
D. tormis	Late Bartonian	Spain	Salamanca		D. darwini from Messel pit, Hesse, Germany, 48 million years old Skull of D. hantoniensis Diplocynodon cf. ratelii
D. ungeri	Middle Miocene	Austria*; France	Pannonian Basin*; Paris Basin	Synonyms are: Enneodon ungeri, D. steineri, and D. styriacus (see text).	D. darwini from Messel pit, Hesse, Germany, 48 million years old Skull of D. hantoniensis Diplocynodon cf. ratelii

*Locality and/or horizon of the type specimen.

== Phylogeny ==
Diplocynodon is one of the basal-most members of the superfamily Alligatoroidea. Diplocynodon's placement within Alligatoroidea can be shown in the cladogram below, based on a 2018 tip dating study by Lee & Yates that simultaneously used morphological, molecular (DNA sequencing), and stratigraphic (fossil age) data.

- Crocodylia
  - Alligatoroidea
    - Leidyosuchus†
    - - Diplocynodontinae†
        Diplocynodon†
      - Globidonta
        - - Stangerochampsa†
          - Brachychampsa†
        - - Navajosuchus†
          - Alligatoridae
            - Caimaninae
              - - Caiman
                - Melanosuchus
              - Paleosuchus
            - Alligatorinae
              Alligator
  - - extinct basal Crocodilians† (including Mekosuchinae†)
    - Longirostres
      - Crocodyloidea
        - extinct basal crocodiles†
        - Crocodylidae
          - Crocodylus
          - - Mecistops
            - Osteolaemus
      - Gavialoidea
        - extinct basal Gavialoids†
        - Gavialidae
          - Gavialis
          - Tomistoma

Below is a more detailed cladogram of Diplocynodon:

- Diplocynodon
  - Diplocynodon deponiae
  - Diplocynodon darwini
  - Diplocynodon hantoniensis
  - - Diplocynodon ratelii
    - - Diplocynodon tormis
      - Diplocynodon muelleri

In a 2025 study, Jules D. Walter and colleagues argue that many character states previously thought to be diagnostic for alligatoroids were actually much more widespread. In their analysis several genera traditionally viewed as basal alligatoroids, among them Diplocynodon, were found to not only fall outside of Alligatoroidea but to not even be true crocodilians, instead representing derived non-crocodilian eusuchians.

== Palaeobiology ==
Osteohistological analysis of D. hantoniensis suggests that it had a similar pattern of growth to the modern American alligator, exhibiting a determinate, seasonally-controlled rate of growth. Additionally, D. hantoniensis was allometrically very similar to American alligators, with the femoral length and femoral circumference scaling in a similar fashion in both species.

CT scans of D. tormis reconstruct internal structures of its snout and a portion of its brain, with implications for its sensory and cognitive capabilities. The relative sizes of the olfactory bulbs overlap with alligatoroids and fall short of true crocodiles, adding to anatomical evidence for a closer relationship to alligatoroids. The optic lobes and reptile encephalization quotient are proportionally smaller than other medium-sized crocodilians, though this could be influenced by incomplete preservation at the back of the skull.

== Palaeoecology ==
Based on skull shape analysis of the crocodylians known from the Lutetian site of Geiseltal, Diplocynodon was a small generalist carnivore that partitioned its resources with the larger Asiatosuchus. According to enamel δ^{13}C values from specimens from the Late Oligocene site of Enspel, the Diplocynodon living in the palaeoenvironment fed primarily on aquatic vertebrates.
