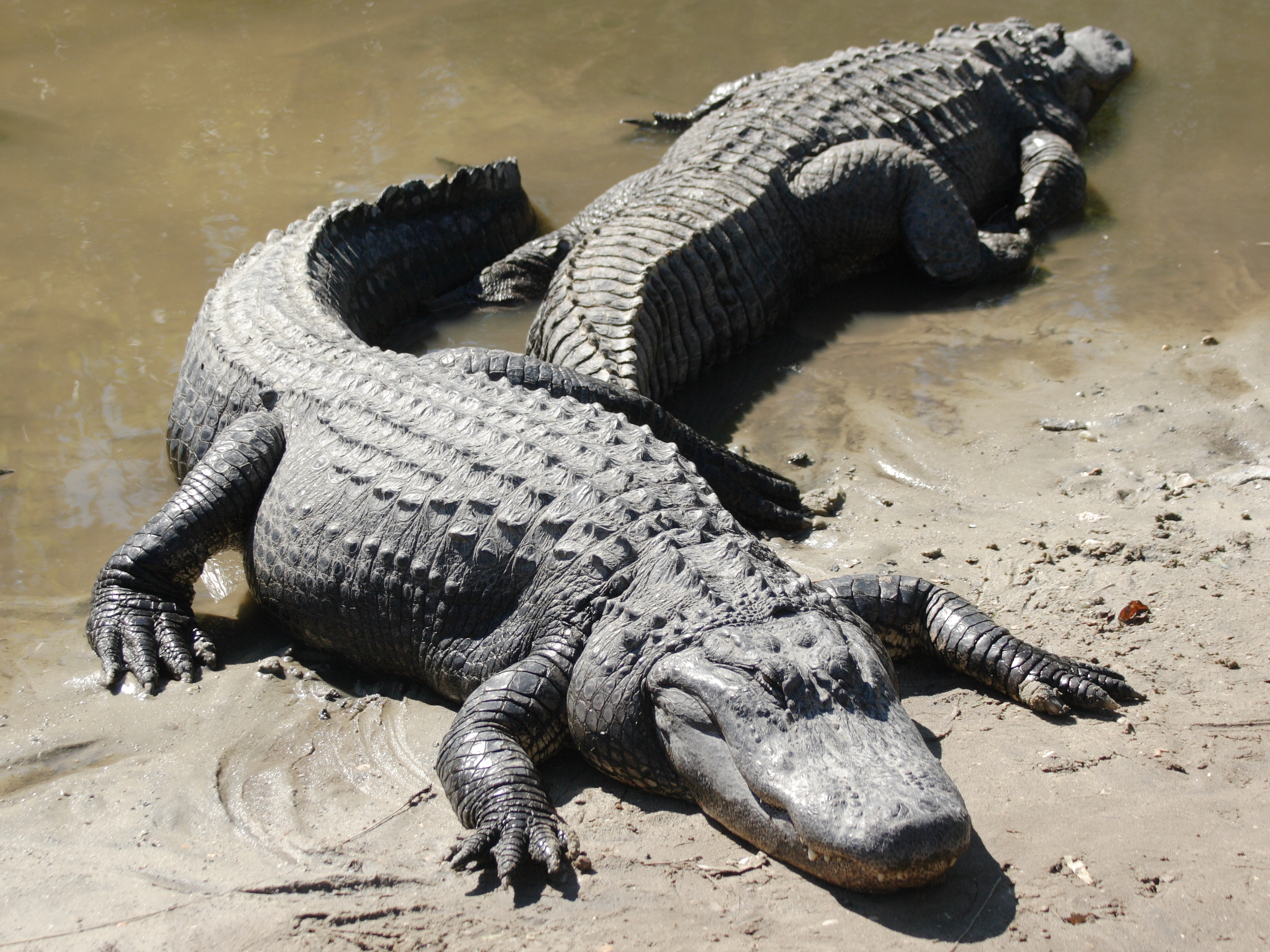
- Alligators (shown above) and caimans are living members of the superfamily Alligatoroidea.

Scientific classification
- Kingdom: Animalia
- Phylum: Chordata
- Order: Crocodylia
- Superfamily: Alligatoroidea; Gray, 1844

Subgroups
- †Deinosuchus?; †Diplocynodon; †Leidyosuchus?; †Listrognathosuchus; Globidonta

= Alligatoroidea =

Alligatoroidea Temporal range: Campanian–Present

Superfamily of reptiles

Alligatoroidea is one of three superfamilies of crocodylians, the other two being Crocodyloidea and Gavialoidea. Alligatoroidea evolved in the Late Cretaceous period, and consists of the alligators and caimans, as well as extinct members more closely related to the alligators than the two other groups.

== Evolution ==
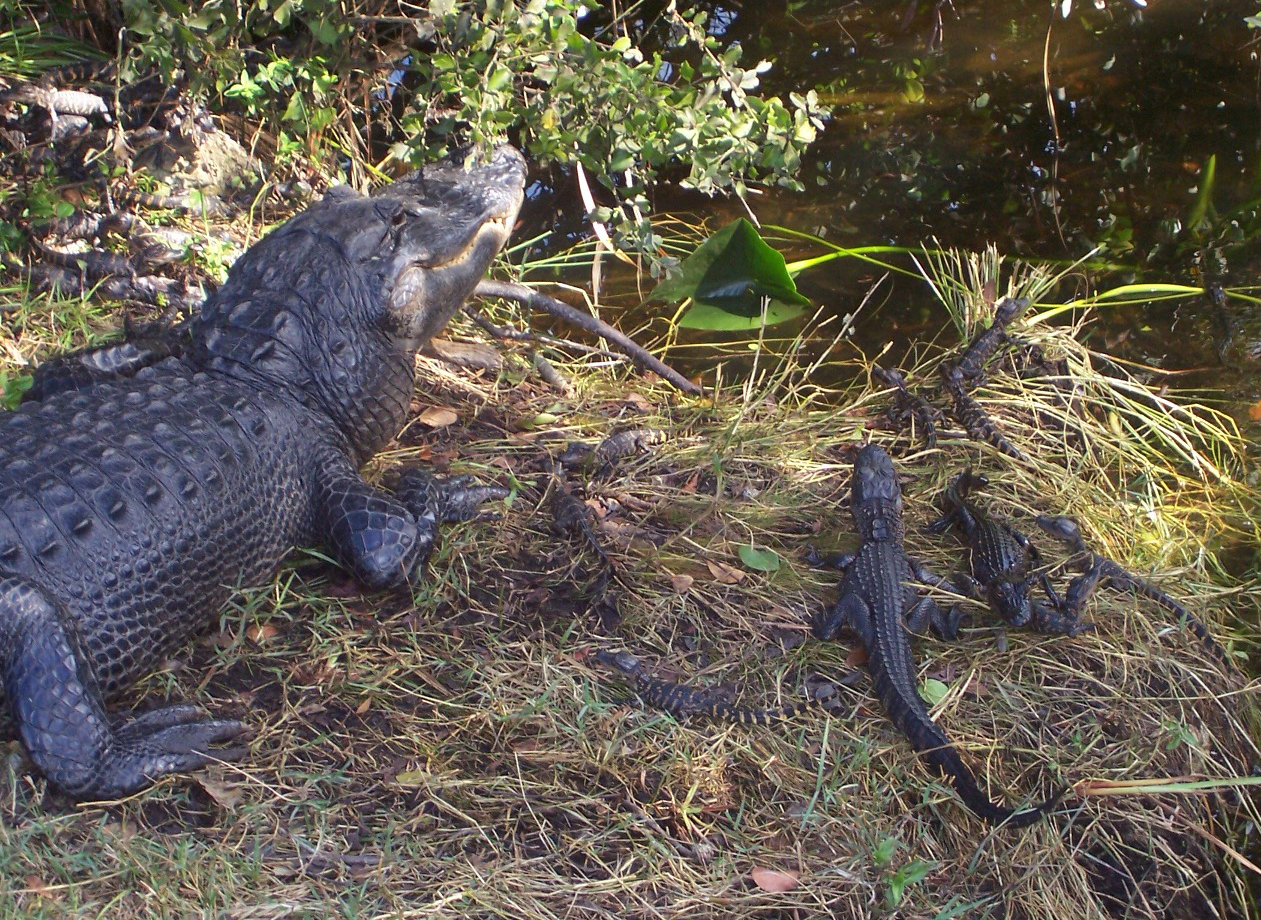
An alligator nest at Everglades National Park, Florida, United States

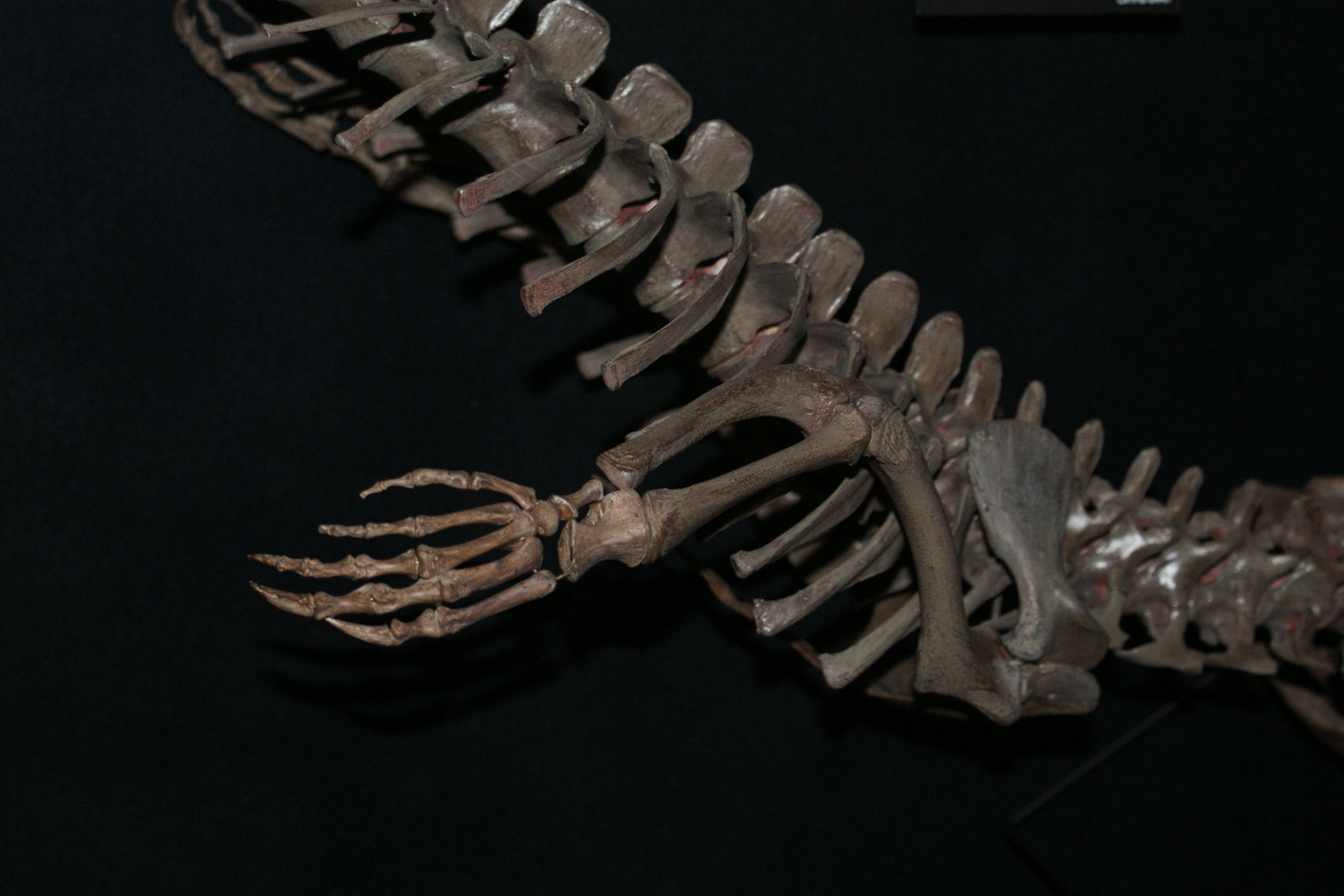
Alligator olseni forelimb

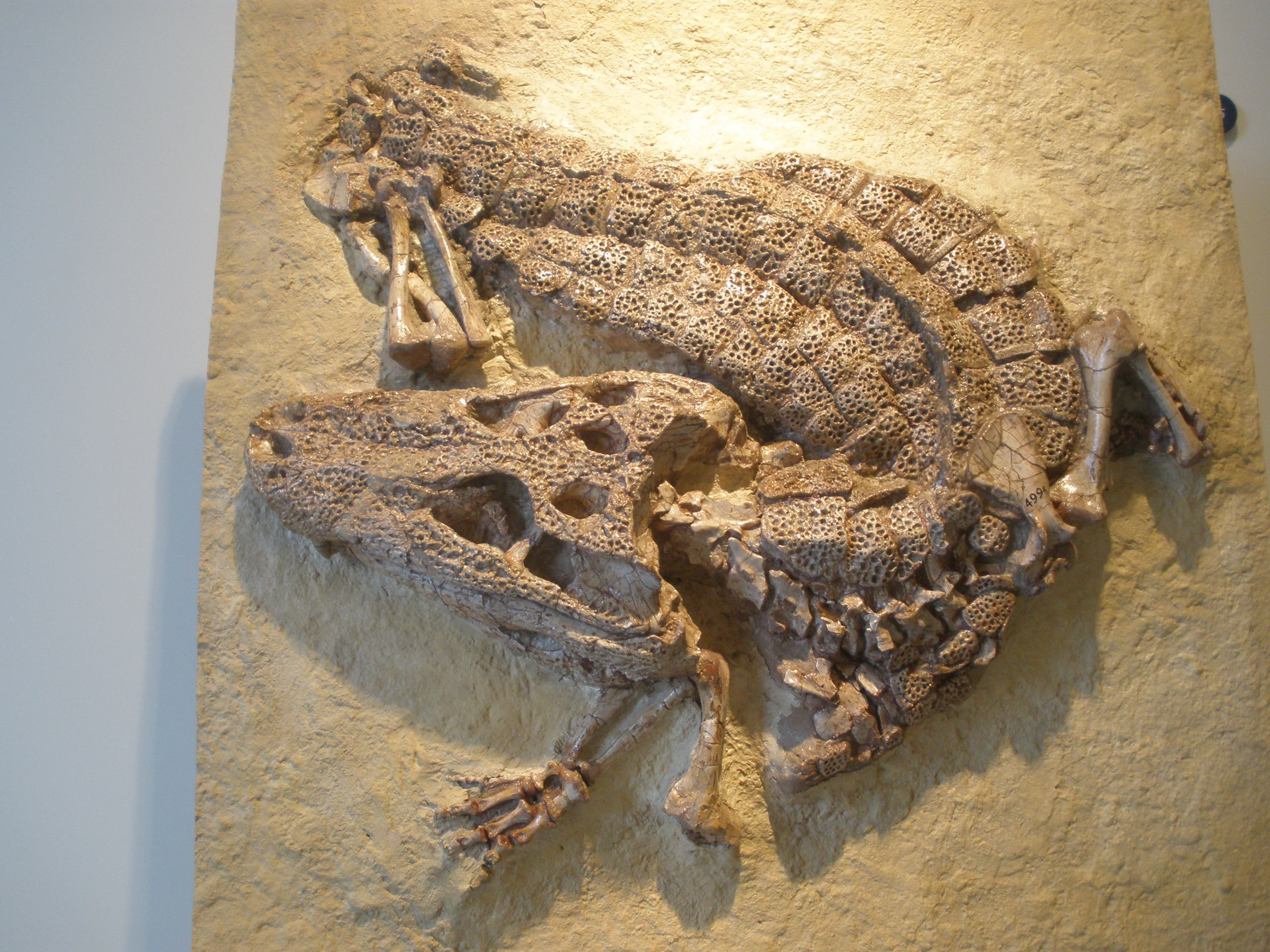
Alligator prenasalis fossil

The superfamily Alligatoroidea is thought to have split from the crocodile-gharial lineage in the late Cretaceous, about 80 million years ago, but possibly as early as 100 million years ago based on molecular phylogenetics. Leidyosuchus of Alberta is the earliest known genus. Although, a 2025 study considers it and Deinosuchus to be non-crocodylian eusuchians closely related to crocodylians. Fossil alligatoroids have been found throughout Eurasia as land bridges across both the North Atlantic and the Bering Strait have connected North America to Eurasia during the Cretaceous, Paleogene, and Neogene periods. Alligators and caimans split in North America during the early Tertiary or late Cretaceous (about 53 million to about 65 million years ago) and the latter reached South America by the Paleogene, before the closure of the Isthmus of Panama during the Neogene period. The Chinese alligator split from the American alligator about 33 million years ago and likely descended from a lineage that crossed the Bering land bridge during the Neogene. The modern American alligator is well represented in the fossil record of the Pleistocene. The alligator's full mitochondrial genome was sequenced in the 1990s. The full genome, published in 2014, suggests that the alligator evolved much more slowly than mammals and birds.

== Phylogeny ==
Cladistically, Alligatoroidea is defined as Alligator mississippiensis (the American alligator) and all crocodylians more closely related to A. mississippiensis than to either Crocodylus niloticus (the Nile crocodile) or Gavialis gangeticus (the gharial). This is a stem-based definition for alligators, and is more inclusive than the crown group Alligatoridae. As a crown group, Alligatoridae only includes the last common ancestor of all extant (living) alligators, caimans, and their descendants (living or extinct), whereas Alligatoroidea, as a stem group, also includes more basal extinct alligator ancestors that are more closely related to living alligators than to crocodiles or gavialids. When considering only living taxa (neontology), this makes Alligatoroidea and Alligatoridae synonymous, and only Alligatoridae is used. Thus, Alligatoroidea is only used in the context of paleontology.

Traditionally, crocodiles and alligators were considered more closely related and grouped together in the clade Brevirostres, to the exclusion of the gharials. This classification was based on morphological studies primarily focused on analyzing skeletal traits of living and extinct fossil species. However, recent molecular studies using DNA sequencing have rejected Brevirostres upon finding the crocodiles and gavialids to be more closely related than the alligators. The new clade Longirostres was named by Harshman et al. in 2003.

A 2018 tip dating study by Lee & Yates simultaneously using morphological, molecular (DNA sequencing), and stratigraphic (fossil age) data established the inter-relationships within Crocodilia, which was expanded upon in 2021 by Hekkala et al. using paleogenomics by extracting DNA from the extinct Voay.

The below cladogram shows the results of the latest study:

- Crocodylia (crown group)
  - Alligatoroidea (stem-based group)
    - Leidyosuchus†
    - - Diplocynodontinae†
        Diplocynodon†
      - Globidonta
        - - Stangerochampsa†
          - Brachychampsa†
        - - Navajosuchus†
          - Alligatoridae (crown group)
            - Caimaninae
              - - Caiman
                - Melanosuchus
              - Paleosuchus
            - Alligatorinae
              Alligator
  - - extinct basal Crocodilians† (including Mekosuchinae†)
    - Longirostres (crown group)
      - Crocodyloidea (stem-based group)
        - extinct basal crocodiles†
        - Crocodylidae (crown group)
          - Crocodylus
          - - Mecistops
            - Osteolaemus
      - Gavialoidea (stem-based group)
        - extinct basal Gavialoids†
        - Gavialidae (crown group)
          - Gavialis
          - Tomistoma
