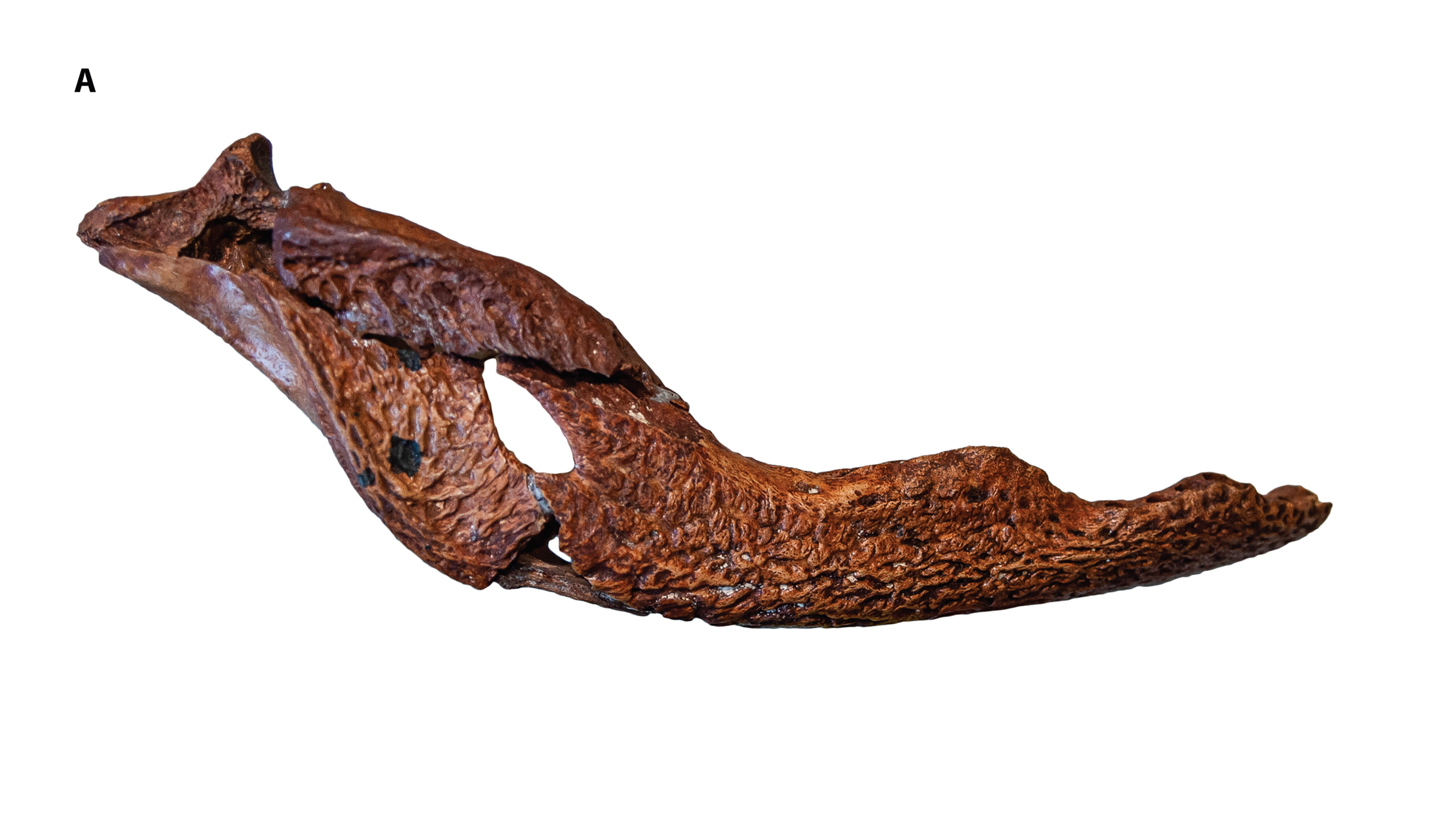
- Mekosuchus inexpectatus mandible

Scientific classification
- Kingdom: Animalia
- Phylum: Chordata
- Class: Reptilia
- Order: Crocodylia
- Clade: †Mekosuchinae
- Genus: †Mekosuchus; Balouet & Buffetaut, 1987

Type species
- †Mekosuchus inexpectatus Balouet & Buffetaut, 1987

Species
- †M. inexpectatus Balouet & Buffetaut, 1987 (type); †M. kalpokasi Mead et al., 2002; †M. sanderi Willis, 2001; †M. whitehunterensis Willis, 1997

= Mekosuchus =

Mekosuchus Temporal range: Oligocene – Holocene, 28.1–0.003 Ma Survival until just 1,700 years ago is possible, but not certain.

Extinct genus of reptiles

Mekosuchus is a genus of extinct Australasian mekosuchine crocodilian. Species of Mekosuchus were generally small-sized (less than 2 m (6 ft 7 in) long), terrestrial animals with short, blunt-snouted heads and strong limbs. Four species are currently recognized, M. inexpectatus, M. whitehunterensis, M. sanderi and M. kalpokasi, all known primarily from fragmentary remains.

Mekosuchus was a successful and widespread genus, with its earliest members being found during the Oligocene and Miocene in mainland Australia. These species coexisted with a wide variety of other mekosuchines, forming a highly diverse crocodilian fauna including terrestrial hunters, semi-aquatic ambush predators and long-snouted fish eaters. The anatomy of the neck vertebrae of M. whitehunterensis might indicate that it was quite well adapted to stripping flesh from carcasses, using blade-like teeth and violent side-to-side thrashing.

The younger two species were found on the Pacific islands of New Caledonia and Vanuatu respectively and represent some of the youngest known mekosuchines. Mekosuchus possibly died out approximately 3,000 years ago, during the Holocene, but some authors have also suggested that they may have survived until even more recently. Unlike the mainland species, M. inexpectatus is known to have had bulbous posterior teeth that may have been used to crack the shells of crustaceans and molluscs. Some researchers suggest that they were possibly nocturnal animals living in close association with rainforest streams. What caused their extinction is unclear. Although some researchers suggest a human cause, others point out that the potential overlap with human settlements is insufficiently understood and no direct signs of human involvement have been found.

== History and naming ==
Fossils of Mekosuchus were initially recovered from various different sites across New Caledonia, with the first bone, a fragmentary quadratojugal, being collected from Kanumera Bay in 1981. Subsequent years yielded more material stemming from both the Isle of Pines and the Pindai Caves on the main island of Grande Terre. This material included various cranial and postcranial remains, ranging from the complete holotype dentary to skull fragments and isolated vertebrae. Such fossils were first reported by Eric Buffetaut in 1983 and properly described by him and Jean-Christophe Balouet four years later in 1987. Due to the strange anatomy of the material, they initially assumed the animal represented an early eusuchian (at the time considered a suborder of Crocodylia) and placed it in its own family, the Mekosuchidae. Ten years later, in 1997, a second species was described by Paul Willis from the Riversleigh World Heritage Area in Queensland. Named M. whitehunterensis, it was not only geographically separated from the type species but also distinctly older, dating to the Late Oligocene. This marked the first but not the last known instance of a Mekosuchus species being found on the Australian mainland, instead of on an island. The second instance came only four years later with the description of Mekosuchus sanderi, also named by Willis. The most recently described species is Mekosuchus kalpokasi, which was named in 2002 from fragmentary remains discovered at an archaeological site on Vanuatu. A 2003 expedition also yielded additional remains of M. inexpectatus, with additional fossils of M. whitehunterensis being found as well.

The generic name of Mekosuchus derives from the Drehu name for Grande Terre, Mek, in combination with the suffix -suchus meaning crocodile.

== Species ==
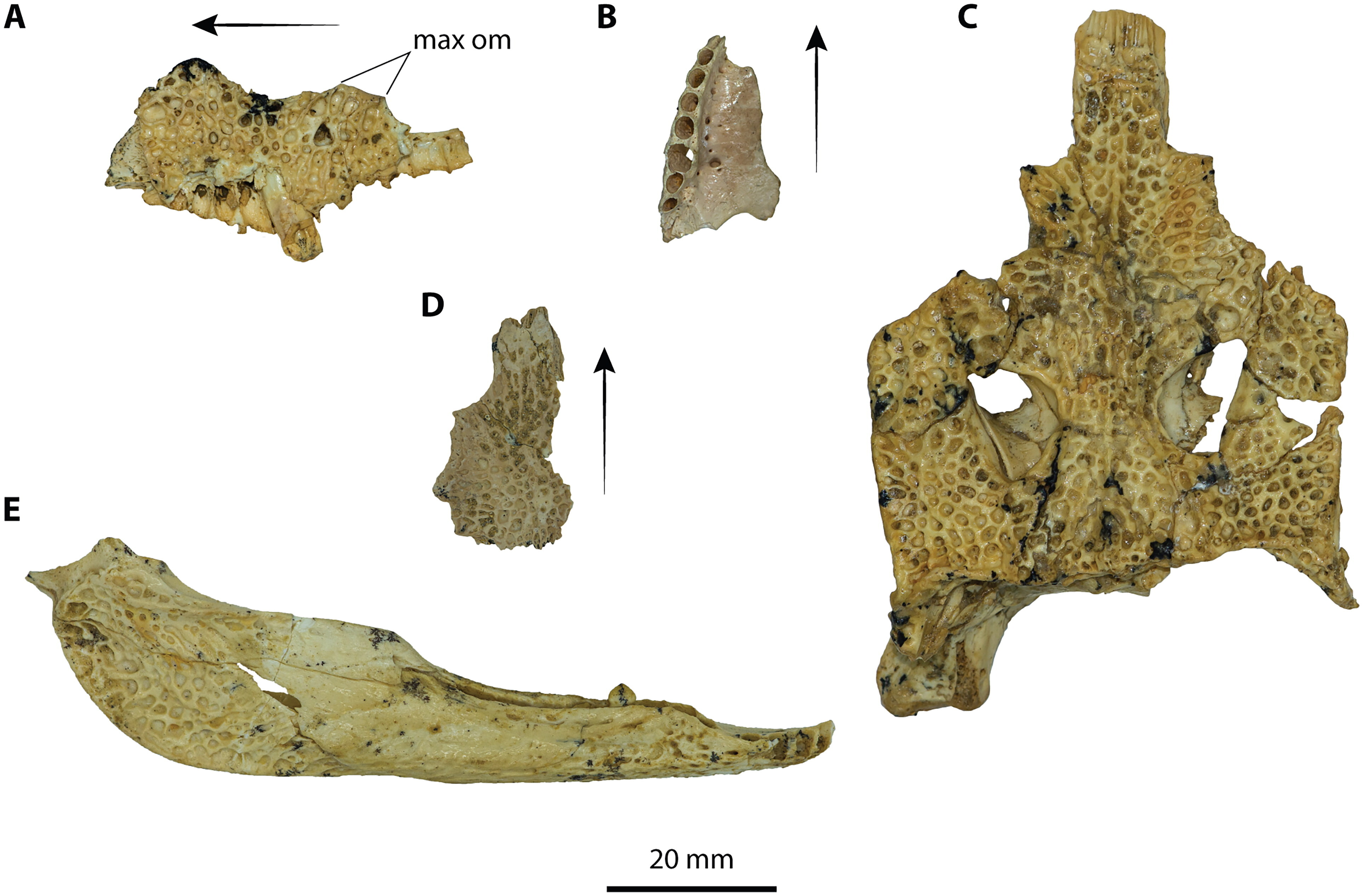
Remains of M. sanderi (A, C) and M. whitehunterensis (B, D, E)

- M. inexpectatus

The first discovered (and possibly youngest) member of this genus is the type species, M. inexpectatus, from the Holocene of New Caledonia. Radiocarbon dating suggests that the M. inexpectatus fossils from the Isle of Pines date to roughly 3,750 years BP. The Pindai Caves material on the other hand appears to have been younger, with some fossils possibly dating to approximately 1,720 years BP according to Balouet and Buffetaut. While survival into human times may be supported by remains found at archaeological sites, the age of some material has been disputed, with some authors suggesting a Pleistocene rather than Holocene age. The species name "inexpectatus" was chosen to reflect the unexpected appearance of a crocodilian on the isolated island of Grande Terre. Over 300 bones have been collected from the Pindai Caves alone, but the majority remains undescribed.

- M. kalpokasi

The second Holocene species is M. kalpokasi, which lived on the island of Éfaté of Vanuatu approximately 3,200 to 2,706 years BP. Unlike with M. inexpectatus, the age of M. kalpokasi has not been disputed, making it the youngest confirmed species but also the least well understood. The remains of this species are fragmentary, consisting only of a partial maxilla and the ends of a tibia and fibula. For this reason, the poor preservation of the same area in the type species and the two species geographic and temporal range, Holt and colleagues suggest that this species may be synonymous with M. inexpectatus. This species was named after the prime minister of Vanuatu at the time of its discovery, Donald Kalpokas, who was noted for his strong support of the archaeological excavations that yielded the fossils of this crocodilian.

- M. sanderi

M. sanderi is one of two Mekosuchus species known from the mainland of Australia, and lived during the Early Miocene in what is now Queensland. It was named by Willis based on two maxillae and various skull fragments, all stemming from the productive Riversleigh World Heritage Area, specifically the Ringtail Site within Faunal Zone C. The species name refers to Martin Sander, who supported Willis while studying in Germany.

- M. whitehunterensis

M. whitehunterensis is the oldest known species and lived during the late Oligocene and early Miocene in Queensland. While also known from various localities of the Riversleigh, remains of M. whitehunterensis are older than those of M. sandersi and specifically found in Faunal Zones A and B, which yielded the holotype maxilla as well as referred material including vertebrae and skull remains. Besides some more subtle differences, M. whitehunterensis is most readily distinguished from the type species by the presence of blade-like posterior teeth. The name derives from the White Hunter Site, the locality where the first remains of this species were found.

== Description ==
The skull of Mekosuchus was brachycephalic or altirostral, meaning that it was notably short and raised rather than elongated and flattened as seen in most extant crocodilian species. In this regard Mekosuchus has been compared to Trilophosuchus and the modern, only distantly related genus Osteolaemus, which includes the extant dwarf crocodiles. Other researchers have also drawn comparisons between this genus and various other terrestrial crocodylomorphs including notosuchians. Two reconstructions of the skull of Mekosuchus have been published, differing greatly from one another. Following the discovery of additional remains, Holt and colleagues reconstructed Mekosuchus inexpectatus in 2007 with a skull similar to that of modern dwarf crocodiles. In 2014 on the other hand, Scanlon produced a composite skeletal for the skull of M. whitehunterensis, reconstructing it with a much more gently sloping rostrum that differed greatly from the previous depiction of the genus.

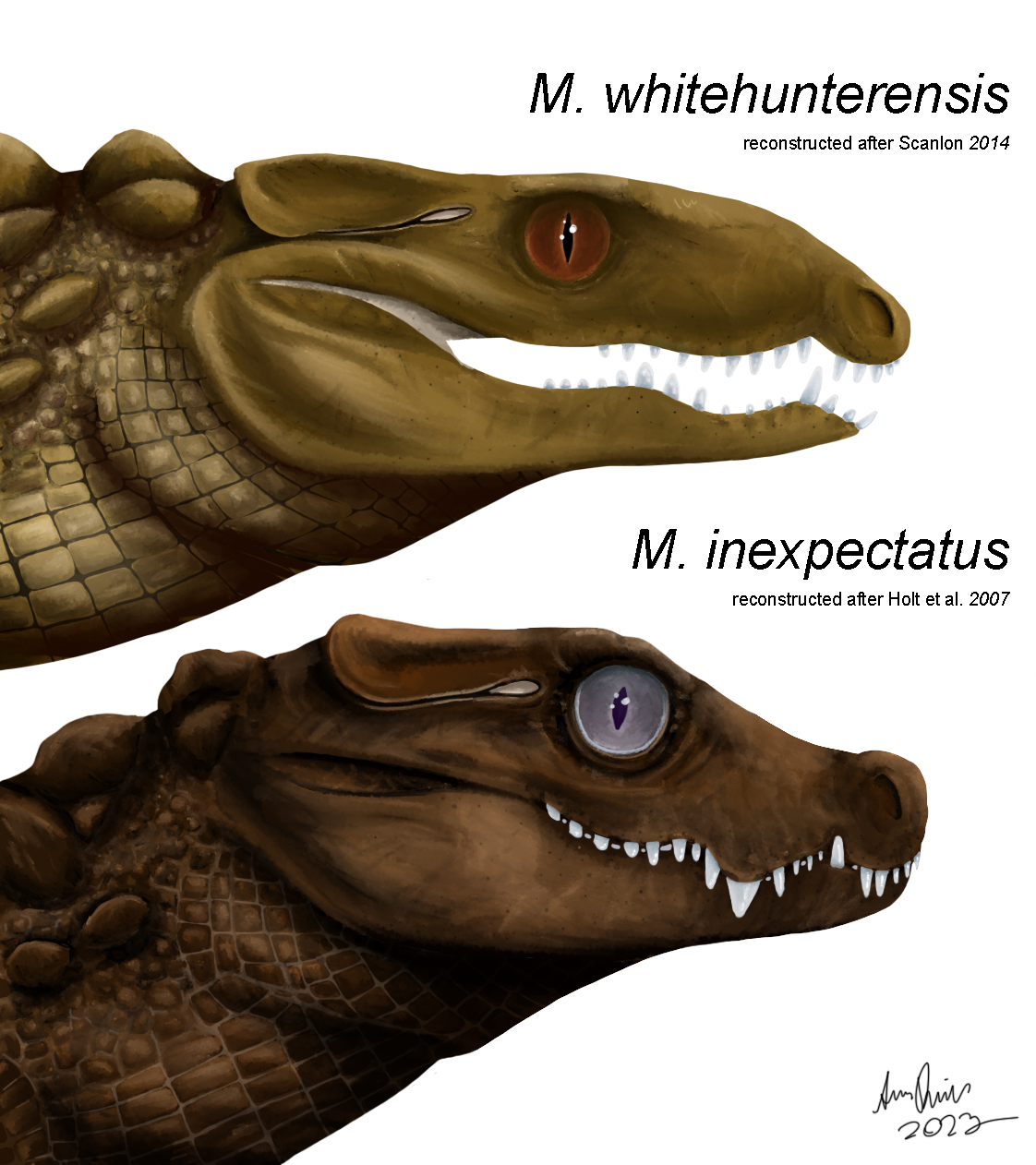
Two different reconstructions of Mekosuchus, M. whitehunterensis following Scanlon 2014 and M. inexpectatus following Holt et al. 2007.

The best known species is Mekosuchus inexpectatus, which was described as displaying a unique mix of basal and derived features of the skull. The palatine bones, which form part of the roof of the mouth, narrow towards the back. The choanae, which connect the nasal passages with the throat, are located further forward (near the palatine-pterygoid suture) than in modern crocodiles and resemble what is seen in some Late Cretaceous crocodilians like Albertochampsa and Thoracosaurus. The wings of the pterygoid bone are well developed towards the back of the skull and the quadratojugal lacks a spine, which is a feature shared by alligatoroids but not by crocodylids. The position of the postorbital bar also differs from modern crocodilians, as it isn't displaced inward or only to a very small degree. The external nares open towards the sides and front of the skull (anterolaterally) rather than facing upwards (dorsally) and the opening is not contacted by the nasal bone. The eye sockets were well-developed and large and, unique among crocodilians, are in part formed by the maxilla, preventing the jugal and lacrimal bone from contacting each other. This unique contribution of the maxilla to the orbital rim is among the diagnostic features of this genus.

As in many crocodilians, the tooth row of Mekosuchus is placed in a distinct, wave-like manner also referred to as festooning. Festooning is usually the least pronounced in longirostrine forms like gharials, which have rather straight toothrows and much more prominent in short-snouted species. The maxilla displays some festooning in M. whitehunterensis and a much more extreme wave-form in M. kalpokasi. While festooning may be exaggerated in younger individuals, an analysis conducted on the material of M. kalpokasi has confirmed it to be an adult.

Other cranial features that can be used to differentiate the four species includes the extent of the palatal fenestrae. In M. sanderi and M. inexpectatus the front edge of the fenestrae extends until the 6th tooth of the maxilla, while in M. kalpokasi and M. whitehunterensis it extends only until the 7th. M. whitehunterensis further differs from all other species by possessing a longitudinal furrow beneath the eyes, while M. sanderi possesses a crest atop the squamosal bone. The extent of the shallow mandibular symphysis, the fused section at the front of the lower jaw, also differs between species. In M. inexpectatus the symphysis extends until the position of the 7th dentary tooth, while in M. whitehunterensis it ends at the 6th dentary tooth. This prevents the splenial from contributing to the symphysis, as it only extends forward to the level of the 7th dentary tooth across all species of the genus. The mandibular fenestra is strongly reduced, being almost closed in M. whitehunterensis, and the angular and surangular bones possess out-turned flanges, both of these are diagnostic for Mekosuchus.

Some postcranial remains are also known, primarily from M. inexpectatus and M. whitehunterensis. Between the two, the vertebrae of M. whitehunterensis are described in greater detail. They are procoelous and the neck (cervical) vertebrae specifically were noted to be shorter than those of the extant freshwater crocodile, even when accounting for the small size of Mekosuchus. This may indicate that at least M. inexpectatus had a shortened neck. The axis vertebra displays the typical sloping neural spine of crocodilians, but bears closer resemblance to alligatorids than to crocodylids. The following neural spines follow the overall pattern expected from a crocodile, though comparably taller than in other similarly sized animals. At the same time, the neural spines are not as inclined as in today's crocodiles, especially towards the front of the neck. This has been taken as evidence that, in spite of being small, Mekosuchus had well developed and strong epaxial neck musculature. It is possible that the neck anatomy of M. whitehunterensis represents a compromise between needed mobility and enlarged musculature. Similar neck vertebrae have been described for both Mekosuchus inexpectatus as well as the genera Trilophosuchus and Volia, indicating that this anatomy may have been more widespread among derived mekosuchines.

According to Willis, the humerus was similar in form to that of modern monitor lizards and Balouet & Buffetaut make mention of well developed insertions for the musculature. In a 2013 abstract it is mentioned that the tuber of the calcaneus, the heel, is robust and unusually short.

Various parts of the osteoderms, the bony armor, are known from across the different species and were specifically mentioned for M. inexpectatus and the Oligocene mainland species. The dorsal and tail osteoderms of the continental species are described as being highly modified, which may be related to biomechanics or simply a defensive adaptation.

=== Dentition ===
The dentition of the four known Mekosuchus species varies between the taxa both in shape, number and occlusion. For instance, the lower jaw of M. inexpectatus contained 13 teeth, whereas that of M. whitehunterensis contained 16. Upper jaws on the other hand can be compared between M. kalpokensis and M. sanderi, with the former possessing 12 maxillary teeth and the latter 13.

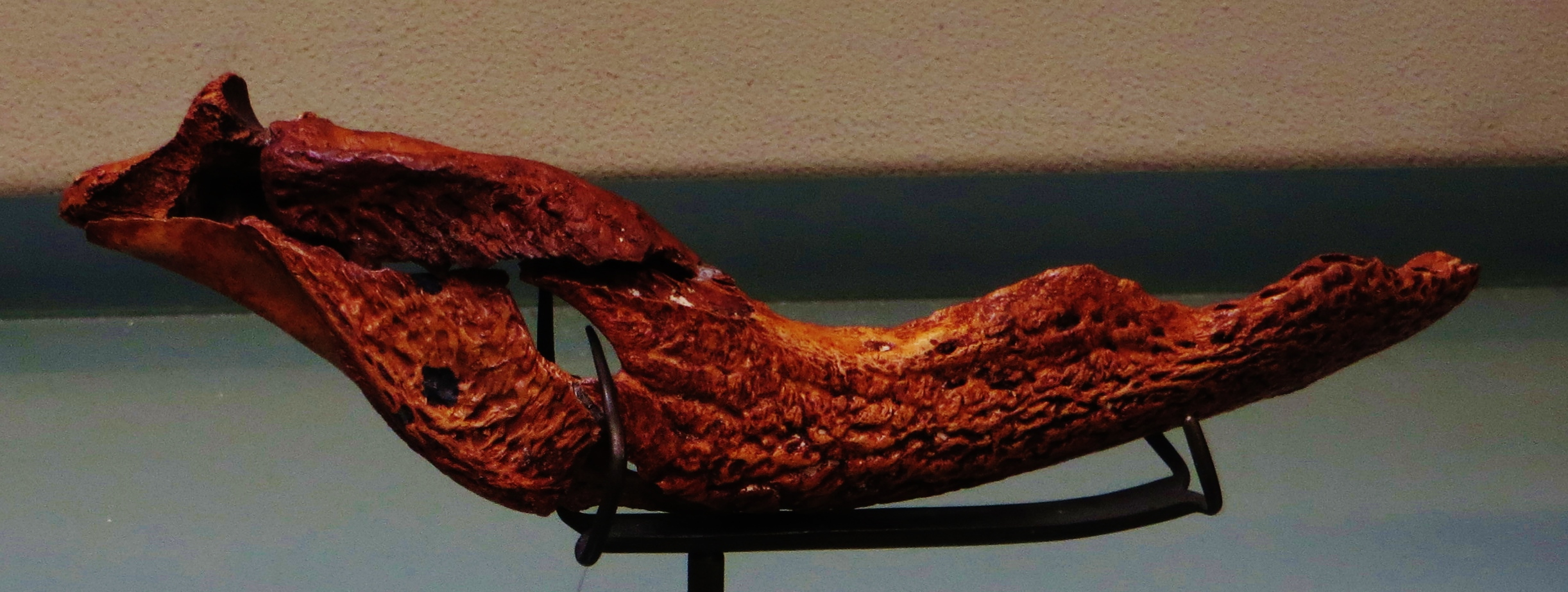
The lower jaw of M. inexpectatus (National Museum of Natural History, France).

However, the differences in shape are more noticeable. The oldest species, M. whitehunterensis, was described as having smooth maxillary teeth that would display flattened sides towards the back of the jaw, making them blade-like. A similar condition can be observed in the younger mainland species, M. sanderi, in which the teeth become laterally compressed following the 5th tooth of the maxilla. The Holocene species meanwhile lack these blade-like teeth. Although only the tooth sockets are known from M. kalpokasi, these suggest that the teeth were circular to ovate in cross section, with no signs of the lateral compression seen in older forms. The teeth of M. inexpectatus are better known, but likewise fail to display the same condition as seen in the continental species. Rather than being blade-like, the posterior teeth of M. inexpectatus were bulbous molariforms, better suited for crushing than for slicing. Similar tribodont teeth are seen in many unrelated types of eusuchians, including Allognathosuchus, Bernissartia and modern dwarf crocodiles.

Similarly, the way the maxillary teeth occlude with one another also varies between these forms. This can be determined either by the form of the toothrow itself or through the presence of occlusal pits that the teeth could slide into when the jaw was closed. Generally, two states are known. Interfingering teeth as seen in modern members of Crocodylus and an overbite as seen in Alligator, however, some species of Mekosuchus also display an intermediate pattern, combining an overbite with some degree of interfingering. M. inexpectatus displays a full overbite in the maxillary toothrow and the same is the case for M. whitehunterensis. In case of the later, most maxillary teeth were simply too closely spaced to allow for interlocking dentition and towards the back of the skull, occlusal pits confirm that certain dentary teeth were positioned further inside (medially) relative to those of the upper jaw. M. sanderi and M. kalpokasi on the other hand feature a mix. In both of these species, the teeth towards the tip of the jaw and towards the back were arranged in an overbite, however, M. sanderi had an interlocking dentary tooth between the 7th and 8th teeth of the maxilla, while in M. kalpokasi the dentition interlocked between the 6th and 7th as well as the 7th and 8th maxillary teeth.

=== Size ===
Mekosuchus is among the smallest mekosuchines and is often referred to as a dwarf species in the same fashion as Trilophosuchus. While growth is a consistent feature in crocodilians throughout their lives, the rate at which they grow each year decreases as an individual approaches maturity. Subsequently, in dwarf species like Mekosuchus this growth rate begins to decrease early on, resulting in their small body size relative to other crocodilians. The fact that Mekosuchus specimens are mature or at least almost mature can be found in the anatomy of the vertebrae. According to Christopher Brochu, maturity in crocodilians can be determined by the fusion between the neural centra and the neural spine, which progresses from the last tail vertebra to the first neck vertebra. Based on this, the vertebrae of the mainland M. whitehunterensis could clearly be identified as having belonged to an almost mature individual, despite its small size. The most complete skull of this species measures only 100 mm (3.9 in), which may result in a total body length of only 60 cm (24 in). This puts M. whitehunterensis within the lower size range of today's dwarf crocodilians, Osteolaemus and Paleosuchus, both of which typically reach lengths of over 1 m (3 ft 3 in) when fully grown. Estimates for other members of the genus are generally less precise, but fall into the same overall size range. M. inexpectatus for instance has been estimated to have reached a length of approximately 2 m (6 ft 7 in) by Balouet, while Holt and colleagues estimate members of Mekosuchus to be around 1 m (3 ft 3 in) in length.

== Phylogeny ==
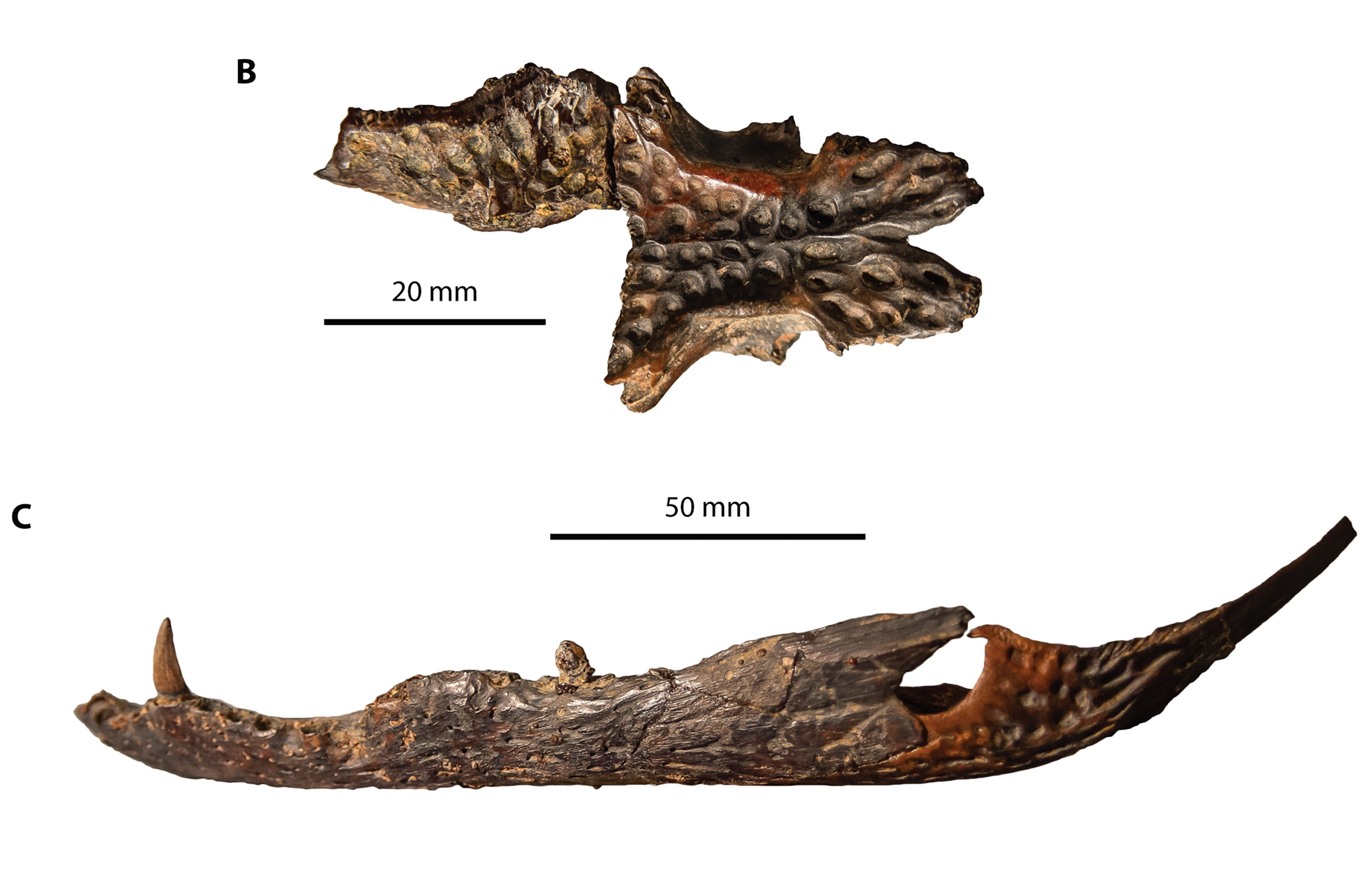
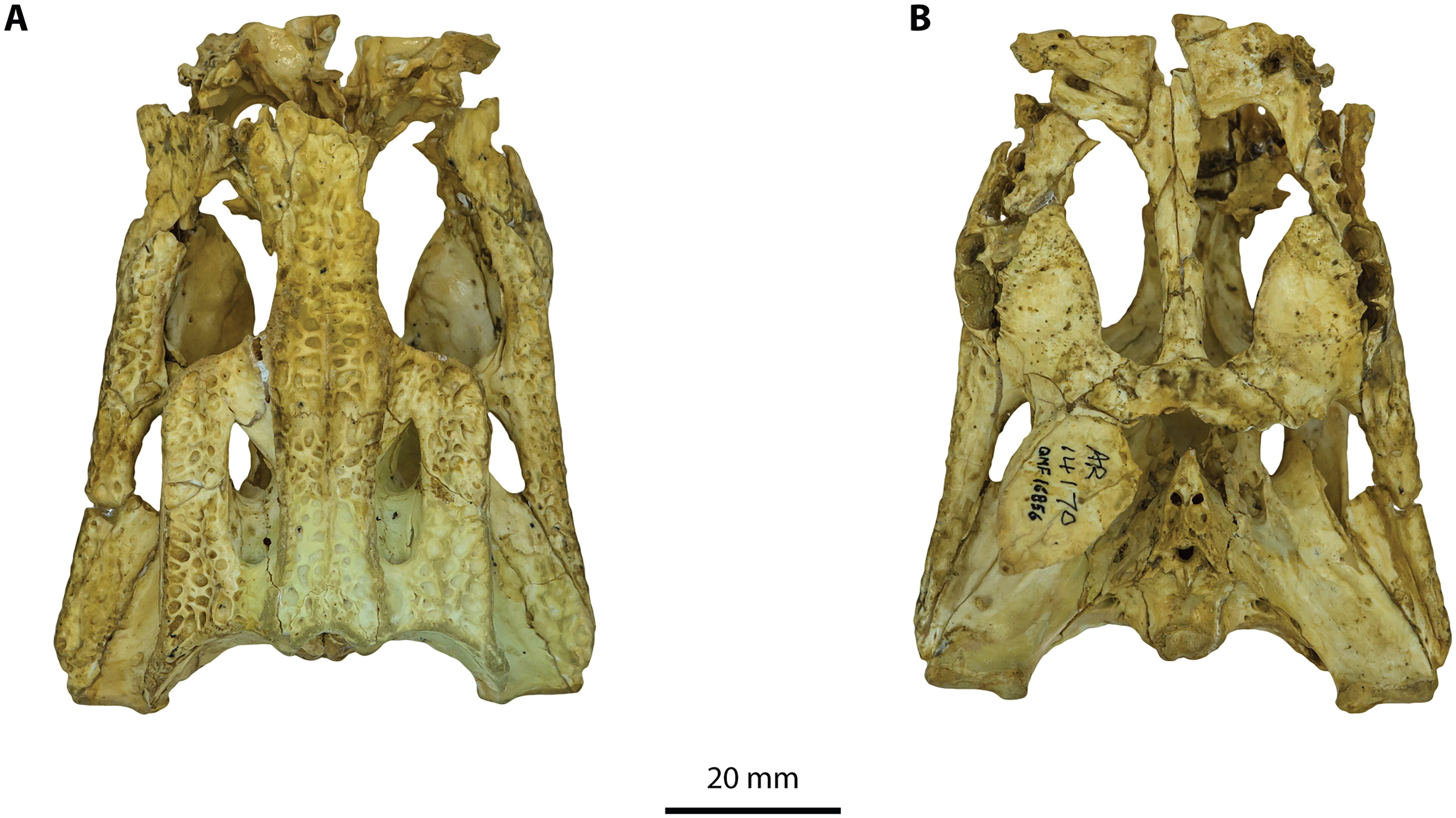
Volia and Trilophosuchus are commonly found to be the closest relatives of Mekosuchus.

When first describing Mekosuchus, Balouet and Buffetaut struggled to determine the relationship between it and modern crocodilians, noting how the taxon displayed a variety of basal and derived traits that did not align perfectly with any of the modern groups. They ultimately determined that Mekosuchus was a Eusuchian based on the choanae and the procoelous vertebrae, and placed it in the monotypic family Mekosuchidae, which they believed to have been the sister group to all three modern crocodilian families. Since then, research on Australasian crocodilians has placed a wide range of other taxa in the family, which is now referred to by the name Mekosuchinae. Although mekosuchines are still a poorly understood group whose internal and external relationships commonly shift, Mekosuchus is traditionally allied with other altirostral forms such as Trilophosuchus and Quinkana. Willis (1997) suggests a close link between Mekosuchus and Trilophosuchus, with Quinkana as their sister taxon, while Mead et al. (2002) place Mekosuchus, Quinkana and a then unnamed Volia in a large polytomy as sisters to Trilophosuchus within the clade Mekosuchini. A 2018 tip dating study by Lee & Yates using a combination of morphological, molecular (DNA sequencing), and stratigraphic (fossil age) data recovered broadly similar results, although the precise relations within Mekosuchini do differ. Here, Trilophosuchus was recovered as the closest relative of Quinkana, with Mekosuchus being the sister taxon to their grouping and Volia as the basalmost mekosuchinin.

- - Mekosuchinae
    - Australosuchus†
    - - - Kambara taraina†
        - Kambara implexidens†
      - - Kambara murgonensis†
        - - - - Kalthifrons†
              - Pallimnarchus†
            - - Baru wickeni†
              - - Baru darrowi†
                - Baru Alcoota†
          - - - Bullock Creek taxon†
              - Baru huberi†
            - - Volia†
              - - Mekosuchus†
                - - Trilophosuchus†
                  - Quinkana†
  - Longirostres

The most recent analysis was performed by Ristevski et al. in 2023 and put a broader focus on not just Mekosuchines but Australasian crocodylifroms in general, which includes the extant crocodylids of Australia, Australian gavialoids as well as more basal taxa like those placed in Susisuchidae. Six out of eight analyses recovered Mekosuchinae as a monophyletic group similar to the results of Lee and Yates. These analyses recovered most mekosuchines within Mekosuchini, which in turn was split into two clades. On the one hand large, continental forms and on the other small and/or insular taxa. The latter clade somewhat resembles the previous relationships suggested for Mekosuchus, as it also contains Volia and Trilophosuchus. Notably however, "Baru" huberi was recovered as the basalmost member of this group, while Quinkana was placed in the large-bodied, continental clade. The remaining two trees deviated greatly from the traditional composition of Mekosuchinae, with Kambara and Australosuchus being recovered elsewhere in Crocodylia and Mekosuchinae also including the clade Orientalosuchina, small-bodied Cretaceous to Paleogene crocodilians from Asia. However, support for these trees is low as indicated by both phylogenetic results and morphological similarities, with many uniting characters being widespread among crocodilians. Regardless of the relationship between Mekosuchinae and Orientalosuchina, the closest relatives to Mekosuchus remain the same across the analyses, generally recovering the same small-bodied clade composed of "Baru" huberi, Volia, Trilophosuchus and Mekosuchus. Results similar to this were also recovered by Yates and Stein in their re-evaluation of Ultrastenos and "Baru" huberi.

- - Crocodyloidea
    - "Crocodylus" megarhinus†
    - - Mekosuchinae
        - Kalthifrons aurivellensis†
        - - Kambara spp.†
          - - Australosuchus clarkae†
            - - - "Baru" huberi†
                - - Trilophosuchus rackhami†
                  - - Volia athollandersoni†
                    - - Mekosuchus whitehunterensis†
                      - - Mekosuchus sanderi†
                        - Mekosuchus inexpectatus†
              - - Paludirex spp.†
                - - Baru spp.†
                  - Quinkana spp.†
      - Crocodylidae

== Paleobiogeography ==
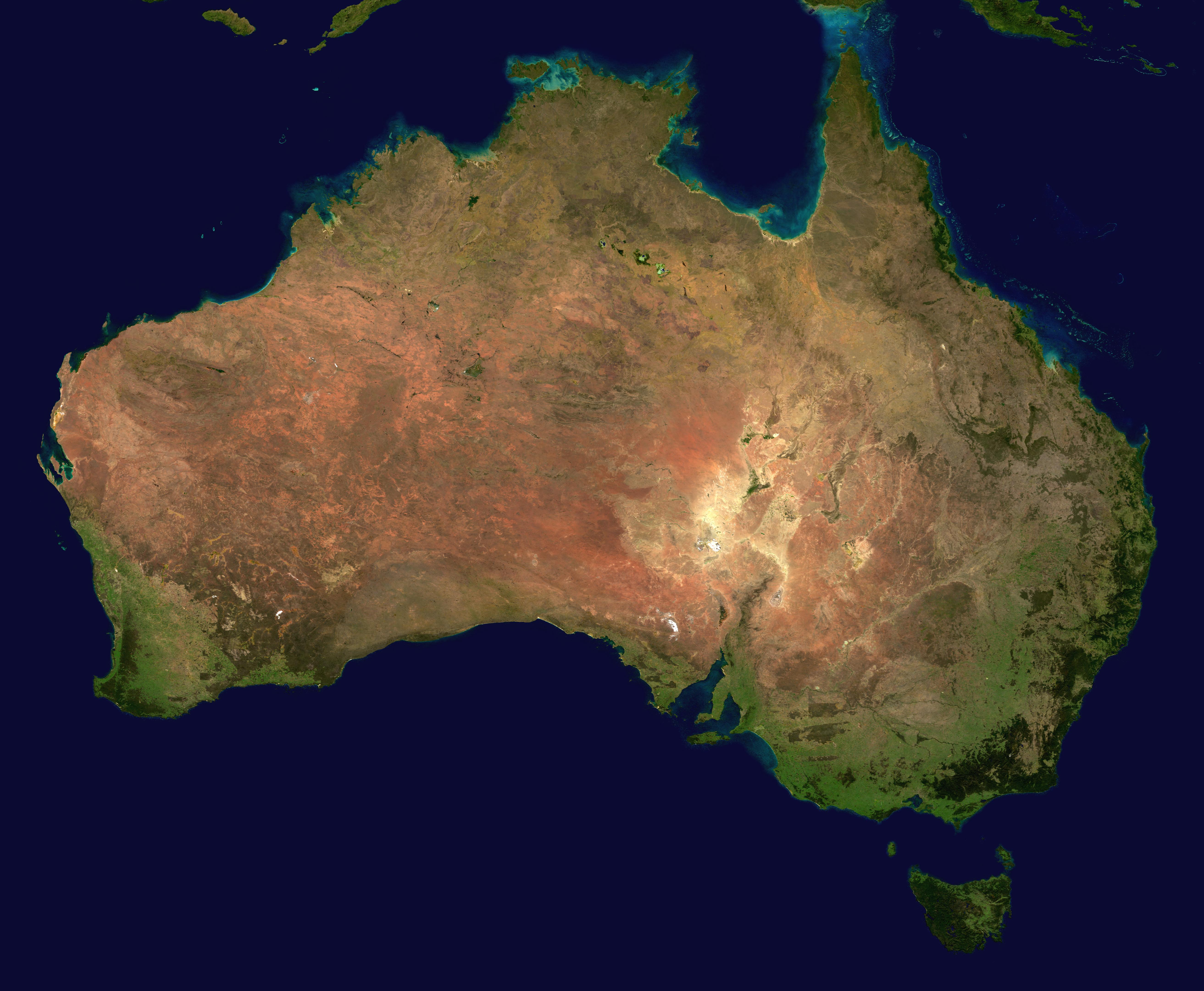
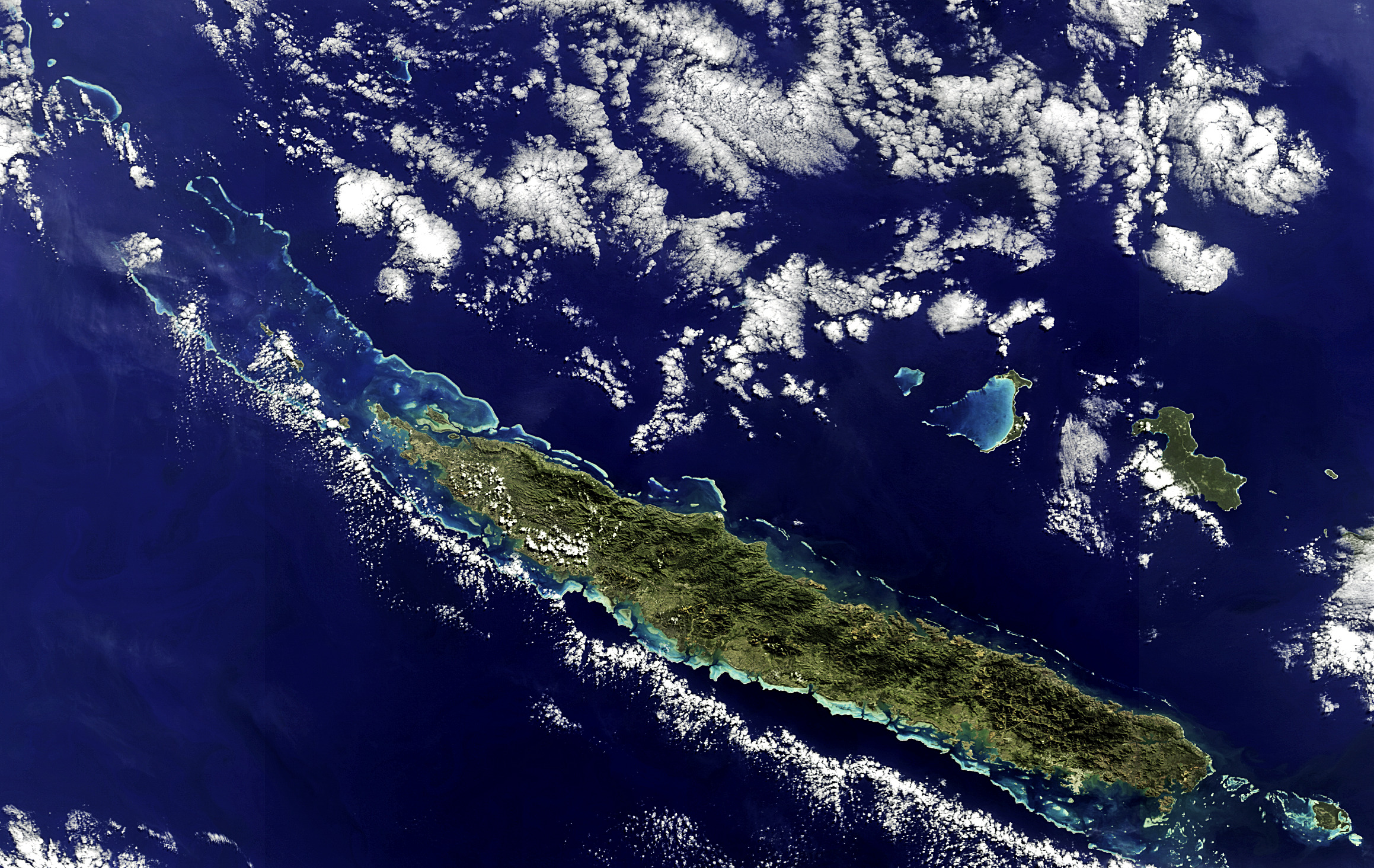
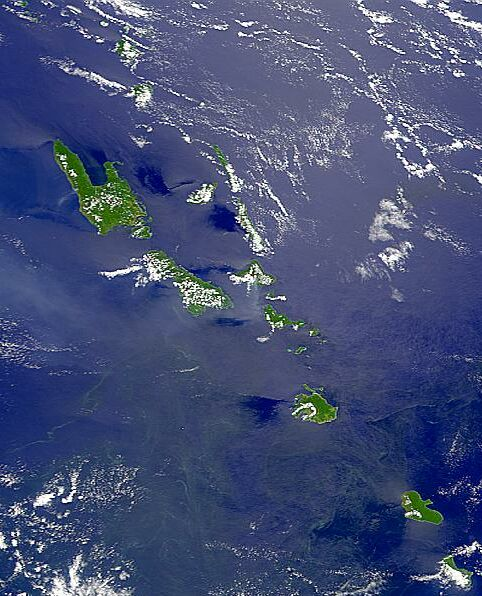
The range of Mekosuchus includes mainland Australia, New Caledonia and Vanuatu.

While fossil evidence shows that Mekosuchus originated on mainland Australia, little is known about how it dispersed throughout the South Pacific. Currently, three mekosuchines are known from the region, M. inexpectatus, M. kalpokasi and Volia. M. inexpectatus may have had the largest range in time among them, with estimates suggesting that it may have first appeared nearly 4,000 years ago. This species is known exclusively from New Caledonia, which makes it the closest geographically to mainland Australia. There is some overlap between the fauna of New Caledonia and that of Vanuatu, with the two islands sharing 12% of their native lizards. One factor possibly important to the similarities and differences among the islands of the region is the geology of the Inner and Outer Melanesian Arc. The former split from Australia during the Cretaceous, while the latter only formed during the Paleogene and Neogene. As mekosuchines first appeared during the Eocene, Mead and colleagues argue that continental drift and break up could not have played a part in their appearance in the South Pacific. Instead, it is considered more likely that the ancestors of the insular mekosuchines traveled short distances across the ocean to arrive on the islands of the Inner Melanesian Arc, before dispersing between the islands of the South Pacific from there. Although it is not known whether or not mekosuchines were tolerant to saltwater or had the same adaptations for marine dispersal as modern crocodiles (such as salt glands), it is possible that they could have actively swam between landmasses or drifted with the use of natural rafts. This process would have greatly profited from the lower sea levels present during the late Cenozoic, decreasing the distance between now isolated islands and in some instances uniting whole island chains. The presence of these significant landmasses could have served as stops or even supported populations during the dispersal of these animals. For this reason, it is believed that Mekosuchus only dispersed into the South Pacific relatively recently. Mead and colleagues name the Oligocene as the earliest possible date, though an even more recent Quaternary dispersal is deemed more likely.

== Paleobiology ==
Mekosuchus, like some of its closest relatives, is believed to have been a terrestrial animal. Evidence for this may be found in several parts of its anatomy. The skull is altirostral, similar to extinct terrestrial forms like Notosuchians and members of the Planocraniidae, while semi-aquatic crocodilians typically have flattened platyrostral skulls, adapted to reduce drag and allow raising the eyes and nose out of the water without drawing the attention of potential prey items. In Mekosuchus, both the eyes and nares are not built for an aquatic mode of life. Rather than opening towards the top of the skull, which would allow the animal to breathe while remaining largely submerged, the nares open towards the front of the skull, and the eyes are similarly directed towards the sides, not the top. Balouet and Buffetaut further point to the well developed muscular insertions and the absence of freshwater in the deposition area, while pointing out that karstic environments are often associated with terrestrial crocodylomorphs. In 1995 Australian paleontologist Paul Willis informally suggested that animals like Mekosuchines may have filled a niche equivalent to modern monitor lizards, even going as far as to suggest arboreal (climbing) habits. However, this idea has been dismissed by more recent research, as monitor lizards had been present in Australia for longer than assumed by Willis, while analysis of mekosuchine toe bones showed no significant differences to those of other crocodilians and thus not supporting the notion that they were exceptional climbers.

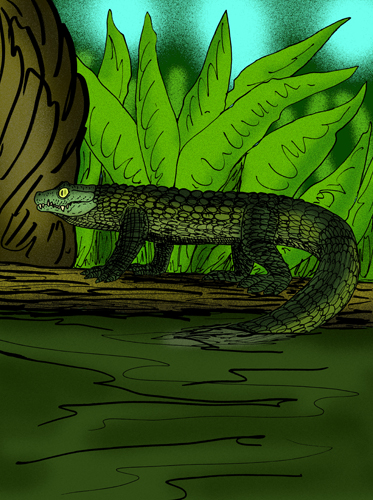
Life restoration of M. inexpectatus

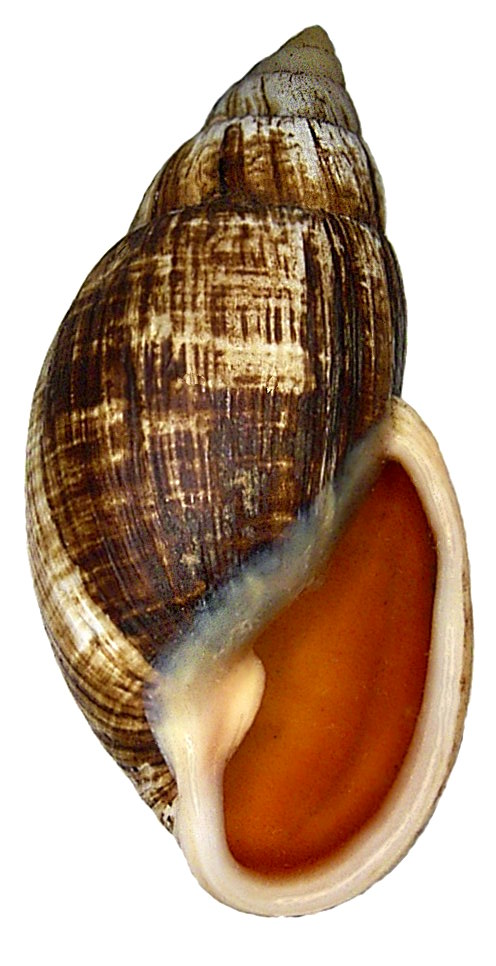
Snails like Placostylus fibratus may have been part of the diet of Mekosuchus inexpectatus.

The strong neck musculature inferred for Mekosuchus whitehunterensis has been interpreted as being an adaptation for ripping chunks of flesh from carcasses. In modern crocodilians this is achieved either through shaking the head side to side or by employing the death roll maneuver. It is noted that the small size of Mekosuchus would render the death roll maneuver less effective than in species with a body length between 3–4 m (9.8–13.1 ft) long, whereas headshaking is favored by small animals like juveniles. Furthermore, Stein, Archer and Hand argue that the well-developed epaxial musculature would primarily increase the force generated by headshaking whereas a death roll would bear a greater risk of the animal harming itself and damaging its limbs trying to perform it on land. Finally, M. whitehunterensis could have also used its neck musculature to strip flesh by pulling and lifting its head against a constrained or weighed down carcass, behavior that has also been inferred for more ancient archosaurs. Whether or not this mode of feeding was used to rip apart much larger prey items or utilized for scavenging is unclear, though Stein, Archer and Hand suggest that it may have been especially advantageous for the latter, allowing for even relatively small animals to consume an excess of food.

These mainland species are known from localities that have also preserved the fossilised remains of multiple other mekosuchines, which they may have coexisted with. The White Hunter Site that yielded M. whitehunterensis also preserved the broad-snouted generalist Baru wickeni and the narrower-snouted Ultrastenos as well as the terrestrial ziphodont Quinkana meboldi. The younger Ringtail Site of the Riversleigh on the other hand preserves another species of Baru, Mekosuchus sanderi and Trilophosuchus. How so many crocodilians could have coexisted with one another may have multiple explanations. On the one hand, the differing skull shapes between them, especially in regards to the White Hunter Site, may be enough for all taxa to fill different niches and thus not come into competition with one another. It is also possible that these assemblages were the result of thanatocoenosis and that in life, all these animals could have had different habitat preferences. However, Willis observed that the mammalian fauna of the Riversleigh WHA indicates a complex but clearly defined pattern of different ecomorphs that filled different niches. For this reason, he suggests that the Riversleigh crocodilians were truly sympatric. Willis does take particular note of Trilophosuchus, which was a box-headed terrestrial form similar to Mekosuchus and thus may have inhabited a similar niche as opposed to the much larger, semi-aquatic crocodilians of the site. It is however possible that they were morphologically and ecologically much more different than currently thought and that the similarities may simply be exacerbated by the lack of better material.

Unlike the bladed teeth of the mainland species, Mekosuchus inexpectatus had specialized back teeth more suited for cracking hard-shelled invertebrates such as molluscs, crustaceans and insects. Balouet and Buffetaut suggest that it may have fed on molluscs of the genus Placostylus, which was common on New Caledonia. Based on newer material and the previously noted similarities between Mekosuchus and modern dwarf crocodiles, Holt and colleagues suggest that M. inexpectatus could have possibly lived a similar lifestyle to the modern dwarf crocodiles (Osteolaemus spp.) or dwarf caimans (Paleosuchus spp.). According to their hypothesis, M. inexpectatus may have inhabited small, slow moving streams in the rainforests of New Caledonia and foraged at night near the waters edge and on land.

=== Extinction ===
The extinction of Mekosuchus in the South Pacific has historically been linked to the arrival of human settlers, in particular the Lapita people. Supporters of this hypothesis point at the fact that the range of Mekosuchus overlaps with human settlement of Vanuatu and the direct association between the bones of Mekosuchus kalpokasi with human artifacts at the Arapus archaeological site on the island of Efate. If the extinction of this taxon was linked to the arrival of humans, there may have been multiple factors contributing to their disappearance. These include the introduction of invasives like pigs and rats, habitat destruction and being used as a food source. However, this idea is not universally accepted and has been disputed by other researchers. Anderson and colleagues for instance note that in the case of Mekosuchus inexpectatus, most remains were deposited prior to human settlement of New Caledonia, with only a single mandible overlapping with human presence. They further highlight that no evidence exists of humans contributing to the crocodilians extinction. The case for human involvement in the extinction of M. kalpokasi on the other hand is more solid, having been recovered at human cultural sites, possibly having been consumed by humans and even the gnaw marks of a rat. Size and inferred ecology of Mekosuchus somewhat resemble todays species of dwarf caimans and dwarf crocodiles, both of which are exploited by humans as a food source and would pose no significant threat to would-be hunters even once they've reached maturity, making them easier prey than their contemporary continental cousins. Still, direct evidence such as mass assemblages of bones or cut marks remain absent.

== See also ==
- Biodiversity of New Caledonia
- Holocene extinction
