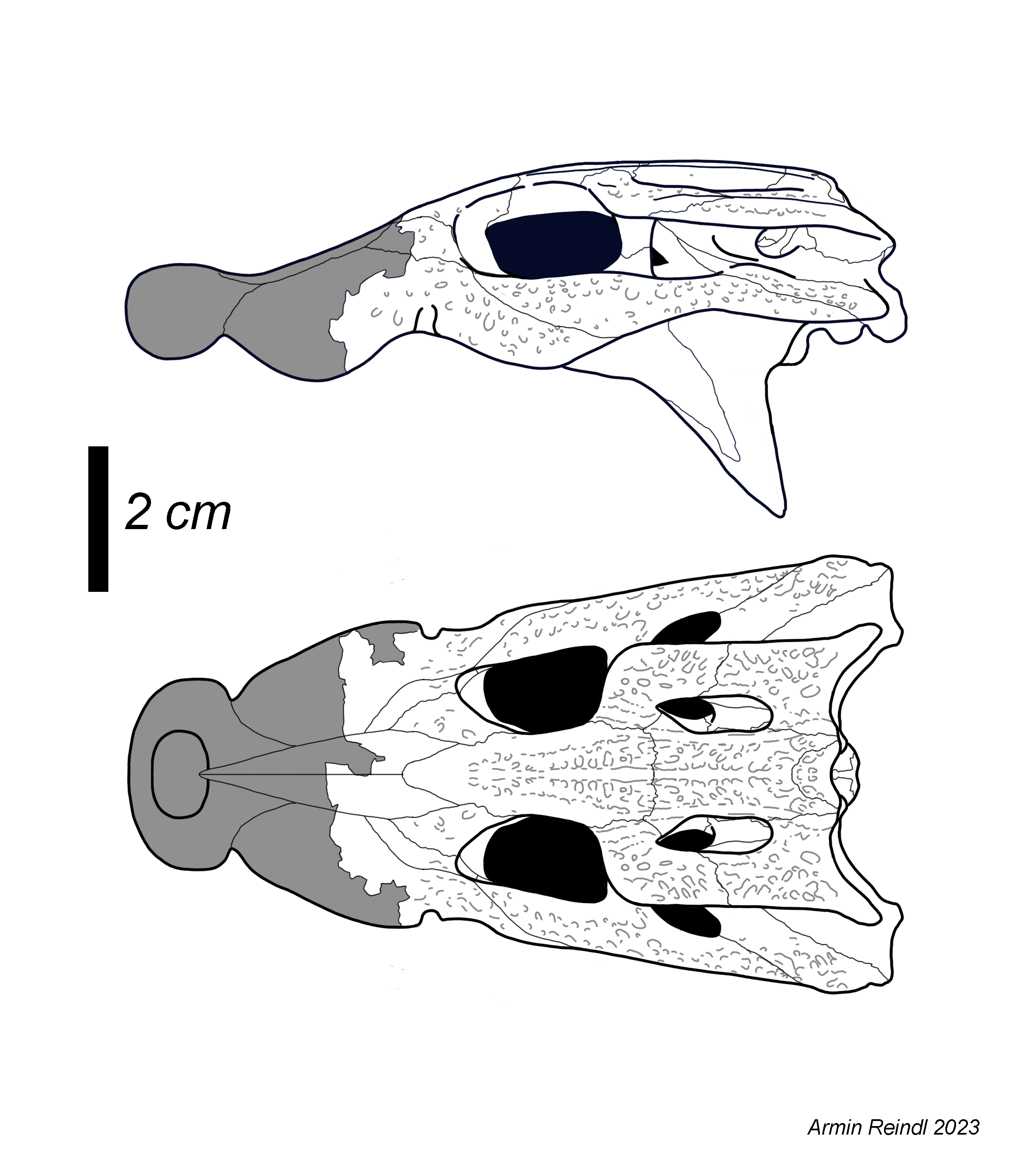

Scientific classification
- Kingdom: Animalia
- Phylum: Chordata
- Class: Reptilia
- Clade: Archosauria
- Order: Crocodilia
- Superfamily: Crocodyloidea
- Clade: †Mekosuchinae
- Genus: †Trilophosuchus; Willis, 1993

Type species
- †Trilophosuchus rackhami Willis, 1993

= Trilophosuchus =

Trilophosuchus Temporal range: Oligocene - Miocene,

Genus of crocodiles

Trilophosuchus ("triple crest crocodile") is an extinct genus of mekosuchine crocodilian from Australia. Its fossils have been found at the Ringtail Site in the Riversleigh World Heritage Area (north-western Queensland) and date to the Miocene epoch. Additional remains have also been found at the older Hiatus Site and extend its range into the Oligocene. Like the closely related Mekosuchus, it is thought to have had a short and blunt snout and large eyes that generally resembles today's dwarf crocodiles. It also shares similarities with several much older crocodylomorph groups and is commonly thought to have been more terrestrial than any crocodilian living today. Only a single species has been described, the type species T. rackhami.

== History and naming ==
Trilophosuchus is best known through holotype specimen QM F16856, which represents a partial skull missing the tip of the snout. Several other isolated bones of the skull were found as well and have been assigned to Trilophosuchus. Most material of this genus has been collected from the middle Miocene Ringtail Site of the in Riversleigh, one of Australia's most famous fossil localities. One referred specimen, a parietal, has been collected the older Hiatus Site, putting the oldest appearance of the genus within the Oligocene. This Oligocene material differs subtly and may represent a second species or could simply be the result of age or intraspecific variation. The holotype skull was uncovered in 1985 during an excavation by the University of New South Wales and is currently considered to be among the best preserved fossil crocodilians from Australia, in spite of the missing snout. The genus Trilophosuchus was erected in 1993 with the description of the remains by Paul Willis of the University of New South Wales in the Journal of Vertebrate Paleontology. In 2022 and 2023, two papers were published detailing the endocast and the skull anatomy of Trilophosuchus, greatly expanding upon the research previously published by Willis. The first of these two studies made use of high resolution μCT scan to map the shape of the crocodilian's brain. This made Trilophosuchus the second mekosuchine with available information on the neuroanatomy after Paludirex.

The name Trilophosuchus derives from Ancient Greek and translates to "triple-crested crocodile", referring to the three parallel ridges that run along the animal's skull table. The species name meanwhile honors Alan Rackham Senior, a supporter of the excavations in the Riversleigh WHA.

== Description ==
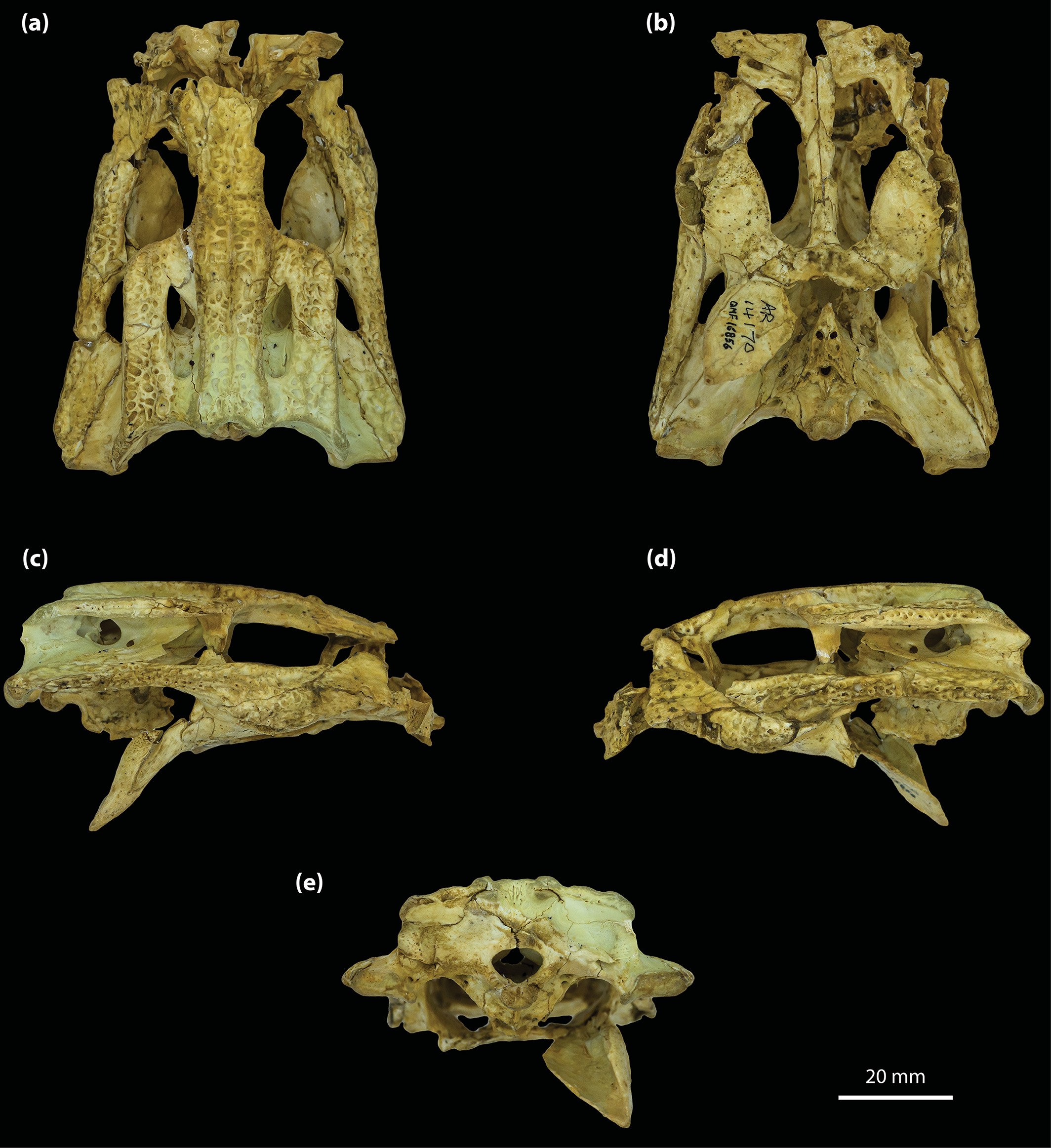
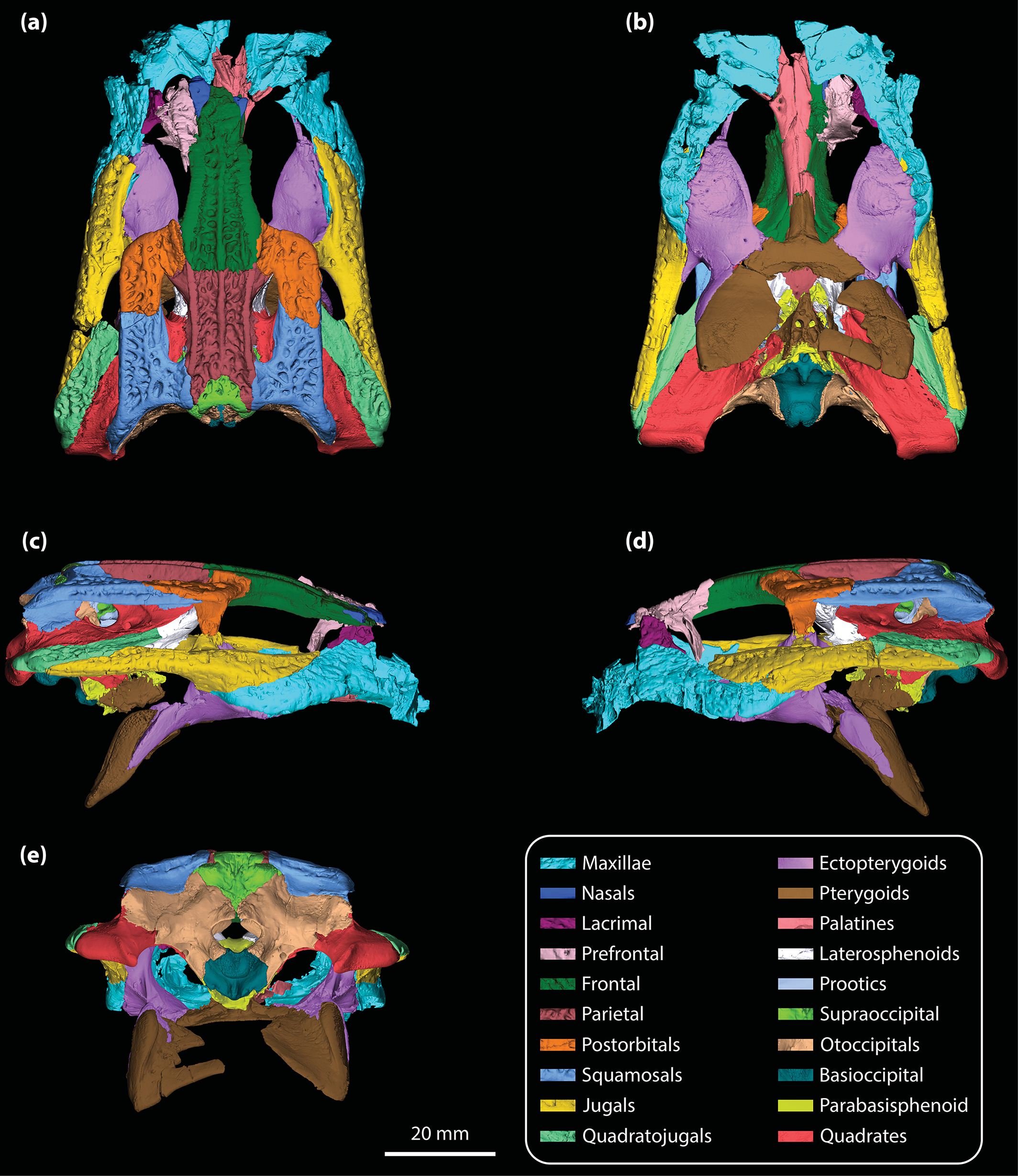
The holotype of Trilophosuchus from different angles. The right image highlights the various skull bones.

Trilophosuchus had a short, deep skull and large eyes that face more to the sides than they would in modern semi-aquatic crocodiles. The snout, though incomplete, is thought to have been very robust, showcasing a trapezoid cross-section just before the eyes. Due to its robust and boxy skull, Trilophosuchus has been compared to a variety of other crocodylomorphs by Willis. Among these are both Osteolaemus (dwarf crocodiles) and Paleosuchus (dwarf caimans), but Willis also points at a variety of Mesozoic forms, in particular notosuchians, Theriosuchus and Protosuchus. Comparison with Mekosuchus is also common, not only due to their similar morphology but the fact that both are known to be closely related. This is evident in part due to the relation between the maxillary bone and the orbital margins. The eye sockets of Mekosuchus are in part formed by the maxilla, which is unique among all crocodilians. While this is not quite the case in Trilophosuchus, the only thing preventing the maxilla from contacting the orbital margin is a small contact between the lacrimal bone and jugal bone.

The palatal fenestrae, two openings in the underside of the skull, dominate the palate and reach up to the level of the sixth maxillary teeth. They are notably wider in this region and taper further towards the back of the skull, where they are constricted by the ectopterygoids. The palatine bone has an anterior process, or projection, that reaches to the level of the fourth maxillary tooth. Behind the palatine and the palatal fenestra, there are large pterygoids and ectopterygoids that project posteriorly and extend below the skull. The ectopterygoid is unique in that its plate bears a large and shallow cancavity. An unusual feature of the pterygoids meanwhile is that they are partially fused along the midline in the region preceding the choanae. The jugal bones, which line the side of the skull below the eyes, project laterally to form prominent ridges. The supratemporal fenestrae, two openings on the skull table, long and narrow and have been compared to the shape of an almond. The entire skull table of Trilophosuchus is somewhat moved forward, which reveals the underside of the basioccipital. This effectively creatures what Willis refers to as a "bend" in the occipital face. The upper portion is vertical, while the lower portion is inclined at a 30° angle forward.

The most distinct feature of Trilophosuchus, and the one that gives this taxon its name, is the presence of three prominent crests that extend alongside the length of the crocodilian's skull table. The central crest originates on the broad frontal bone between the eyes and continues onto the parietal bone before ending approximately at the same level as the supratemporal fenestrae. Two additional crests run parallel to this medial ridge, originating at the orbital margin and stretching from there until the end of the skull table, occupying the space between the midline and the fenestrae. Willis also notes the presence of small knobs on the outer side of the skull table, separated from the three ridges by the supratemporal fenestrae. These may represent an additional pair of parallel crests, tho not as distinct as the central three.

As no specimen of Trilophosuchus preserves the front of the skull, the precise number of teeth is currently unknown. Assuming that the largest preserved tooth socket is that of the fifth tooth in the maxilla, as in other crocodilians, it may have had between 12 and 13 maxillary teeth on either side. The individual tooth sockets, and by extension the teeth, are spaced regularly throughout most of the toothrow. However, between the sixth and seventh alveoli this even spacing is interrupted by a dentary tooth of the lower jaw that interlocks with the upper dentition and creates a prominent notch in the maxilla. Based on the known remains, Trilophosuchus shows a high degree of festooning, meaning the maxillae are distinctly wave-like in their form, visible in both side and top view. The degree of festooning is consistent with adult crocodilians, but may also be exaggerated by the shortened rostrum. The first wave of the maxilla peaks with what is thought to be the fifth maxillary tooth before ascending to the level of the dentary notch. A second wave is present behind this one, peaking around the 11th or 12th tooth. No known specimen of Trilophosuchus preserves the teeth themselves.

=== Endocast ===
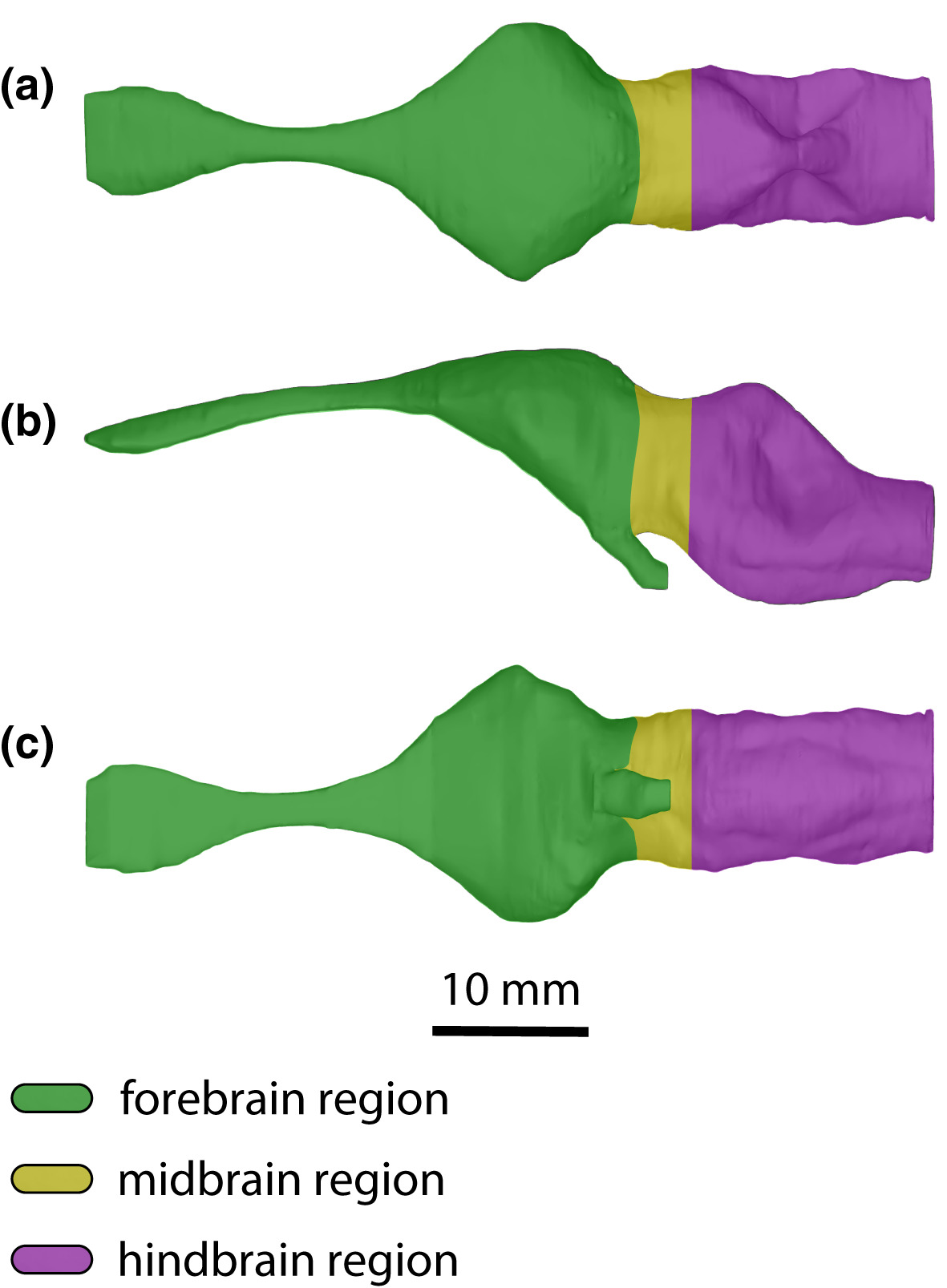
Trilophosuchus brain regions

Like in other crocodylomorphs, the cranial endocast does not accurately reflect the shape of the brain itself and is instead also influenced by the extensive dural envelope. The endocast regardless gives a general idea of the brain shape, which is congruent with the linear and elongated endocasts of other crocodylomorphs. One of the most unique features of Trilophosuchus is the presence of an acute dural peak, an inflation above the hindbrain. This subtriangular peak, in combination with a deeply concave midbrain, gives the endocast of Trilophosuchus a highly distinct form. Such dural inflations are generally not well developed in other crocodilians, with the only eusuchians sharing a clearly distinct dural peak being Agaresuchus and Arenysuchus, though in both of which the peaks are blunt, not acute. Instead, the endocast of Trilophosuchus compares much more favorably to the notosuchians Araripesuchus and Sebecus as well as the dyrosaurid Rhabdognathus. Among these three Araripesuchus in particular is highlighted as the most similar in the overall shape of the endocast.

The inner ear features a distinctly sub-triangular vestibular apparatus (where the semicircular canals contact the common crus), as opposed to being more rounded like in other modern crocodilians. Although this does somewhat resemble animals like Junggarsuchus and Protosuchus, the individual elements are still robust as in other eusuchians, rather than slender. A standout feature of the inner ear concerns the ratio between the height of the common crus and various other elements, in particular the height and length of the endosseous labyrinth and the height of the vestibular apparatus. In all three instances, these ratios are amongst the highest of the analyzed crocodylomorphs, often producing values similar to various basal crocodyliforms, crocodylomorphs, sebecosuchians and thalattosuchians.

In addition to elements of the brain itself, the endocast also reveals several details on the pneumaticity of Trilophosuchus' skull. While crocodilian skulls are generally pneumatized through the presence of air-filled pockets within the skull, Trilophosuchus stands out as having one of the most heavily pneumatized skulls. Among extant forms, it strongly resembles and even exceeds dwarf crocodiles (Osteolaemus) and dwarf caimans (Paleosuchus), and more broadly alligatoroids as a whole, whereas gavialoids and other crocodyloids (sans Osteolaemus) are less extensively pneumatized. While this makes Trilophosuchus one of the most highly pneumatized eusuchians, this system of air pockets is not nearly as complex as in many notosuchians.

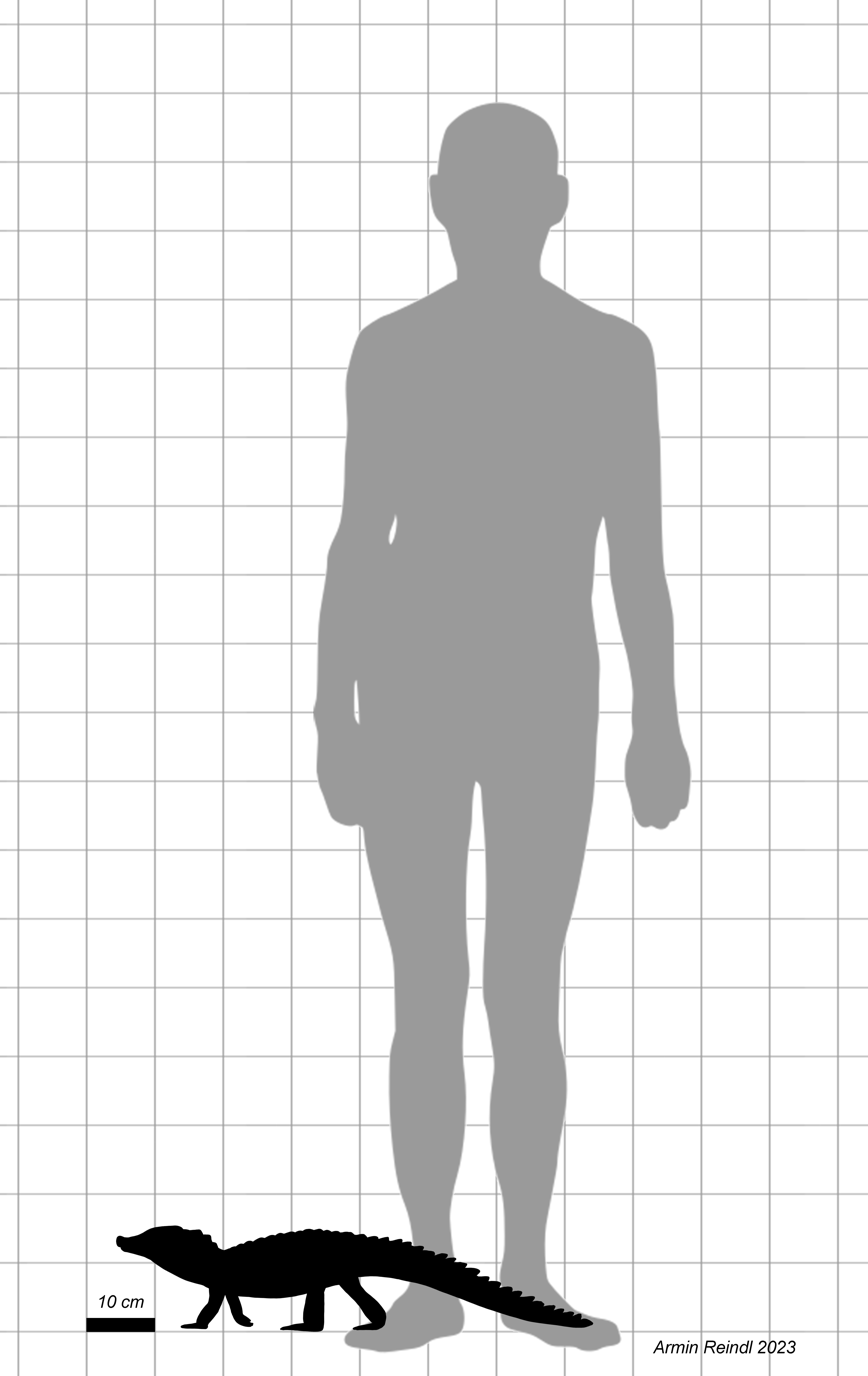
Lower estimate of Trilophosuchus rackhami

=== Dwarfism ===
Several anatomical features of Trilophosuchus have led to discussion regarding the age at which the holotype specimen died. Both the foramen for the trigeminal nerve and the foramen magnum (through which the spinal cord attaches to the brain) are large and the supratemporal fenestrae are elongated and compressed. The inclination of the occipital face also differs from most adults crocodilians. The skull table, though usually flat in adults, slopes in Trilophosuchus from the midline. While all of these features and the overall small size of Trilophosuchus could be taken as evidence that it was a juvenile, both Willis and Ristevski have argued to the contrary. Notably, both the fusion of the skull bones and the sculpting on their surface indicate that it was in fact an adult at the time of its death. They further point out that although the compression of the supratemporal fenestrae is a juvenile trait, their orientation does not match this interpretation, while the inclination of the occipital face could also be explained as being the ancestral condition. This would suggest that rather than being immature, Trilophosuchus was simply a dwarf species, with the juvenile characteristics being the result of paedomorphy. The shape of the endocast also supports this conclusion, showing morphologically mature characters such as the relatively featureless midbrain.

The skull of Trilophosuchus only measures 79 mm (3.1 in) from the back of the head to the front most preserved part of the rostrum, making it very small even when accounting for the missing material. Although no remains of the body are known, Trilophosuchus is estimated to have been around 70–90 cm (28–35 in) long and weighed 1–2 kg (2.2–4.4 lb). These values are calculated through a regression analysis using the width across the quadrates, based on data collected from modern crocodilians. This would place Trilophosuchus in the size range of many crocodilians colloquially referred to as dwarf species, including dwarf caimans, dwarf crocodiles, the Chinese alligator and Mekosuchus, all of which rarely exceed 2 m (6 ft 7 in) in length.

== Classification ==
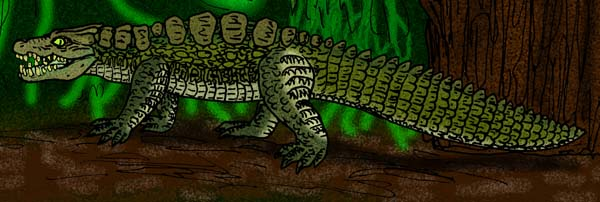
A live reconstruction of Trilophosuchus rackhami.

Despite its superficial resemblance to early crocodyliforms such as protosuchians and notosuchians, Trilophosuchus is an advanced crocodylian. While research on Australian crocodilians was still in its early days during the time of Trilophosuchus description, it was already recognized that it formed a monophyletic clade with the genera Quinkana, Pallimnarchus, Baru and Australosuchus. In this first phylogenetic tree, Trilophosuchus was recovered as the basalmost member of the then still unnamed clade of endemic crocodiles. Additional studies and new discoveries in subsequent years led to a better understanding of the group, eventually dubbed Mekosuchinae following the inclusion of Mekosuchus from New Caledonia and Australia. The addition of Mekosuchus had a major impact on how Trilophosuchus was placed among members of Mekosuchinae, with Willis (1997) suggesting that the two were derived members of the family and sister taxa, with Quinkana as their next closest relative. Mead et al. (2002) also recovered such a clade, but placed Trilophosuchus as the basalmost genus in it, outside of the group formed by Quinkana, Mekosuchus and Volia (which had not been named at that point in time). This marks a trend in coming phylogenies, which recover broadly the same results, but differ in the precise topology of these derived forms. One outlier to this is the phylogenetic tree recovered by Stein et al. (2018), which recovered it as a more basal form related to Ultrastenos. However, this result has been deemed irregular and was likely caused by the inclusion of problematic taxa like Harpacochampsa.

Shown below are three different phylogenetic trees, the first two showing early trees that established the close relationship between Trilophosuchus and Mekosuchus while the third shows it as the sister taxon to Ultrastenos.

Willis (1997)

- - Mekosuchinae
    - Harpacochampsa†
    - - - Pallimnarchus†
        - Australosuchus†
      - - Kambara†
        - - Baru†
          - - Quinkana†
            - - Trilophosuchus†
              - Mekosuchus†

Mead et al. (2002)

- - Mekosuchinae
    - Pallimnarchus†
    - Kambara†
    - Australosuchus†
    - Mekosuchini
      - Baru†
      - - Trilophosuchus†
        - - Quinkana†
          - Volia†
          - Mekosuchus†

Stein et al. (2018)

- - Mekosuchinae
    - Harpacochampsa camfieldensis†
    - - - Trilophosuchus rackhami†
        - Ultrastenos willisi†
      - - Kambara murgonensis†
        - - - Quinkana spp.†
            - Australosuchus clarkae†
          - - Volia athollandersoni†
            - - Baru darrowi†
              - Mekosuchus sanderi†

Putting aside the results of Stein et al. and minor fluctuations between its closest relatives, Trilophosuchus maintained its relative stability throughout the 21st century, as evidenced by the work of Lee and Yates (2018). In their research, morphological, molecular (DNA sequencing), and stratigraphic (fossil age) data once again showed support for Trilophosuchus being part of an altirostral clade including Volia, Mekosuchus and Quinkana, only differing slightly in the internal relationships of this grouping. A more recent phylogenetic analysis on mekosuchines was published by Ristevski and colleagues in 2023. While the relation between Trilophosuchus, Mekosuchus and Volia once again shifted slightly, the only major departure from prior studies was that Quinkana was no longer found to be a close relative of them, instead grouping with Paludirex and Baru. The re-evaluation of Ultrastenos and "Baru" huberi eventually came to lend credence to the tree previously published by Stein et al. in 2016, as the results indicate that "Baru" huberi and Ultrastenos were the same taxon and the sister to the clade that includes Trilophosuchus, Mekosuchus and Volia while maintaining an overall topology similar to that of Ristevski et al. 2023.

- - Mekosuchinae
    - Australosuchus†
    - - - Kambara taraina†
        - Kambara implexidens†
      - - Kambara murgonensis†
        - - - - Kalthifrons†
              - Pallimnarchus†
            - - Baru wickeni†
              - - Baru darrowi†
                - Baru Alcoota†
          - - - Bullock Creek taxon†
              - Baru huberi†
            - - Volia†
              - - Mekosuchus†
                - - Trilophosuchus†
                  - Quinkana†
  - Longirostres

- - Crocodyloidea
    - "Crocodylus" megarhinus†
    - - Mekosuchinae
        - Kalthifrons aurivellensis†
        - - Kambara spp.†
          - - Australosuchus clarkae†
            - - - Ultrastenos huberi†
                - - Trilophosuchus rackhami†
                  - - Volia athollandersoni†
                    - - Mekosuchus whitehunterensis†
                      - - Mekosuchus sanderi†
                        - Mekosuchus inexpectatus†
              - - Paludirex spp.†
                - - Baru spp.†
                  - Quinkana spp.†
      - Crocodylidae

== Paleobiology ==
=== Paleoecology ===
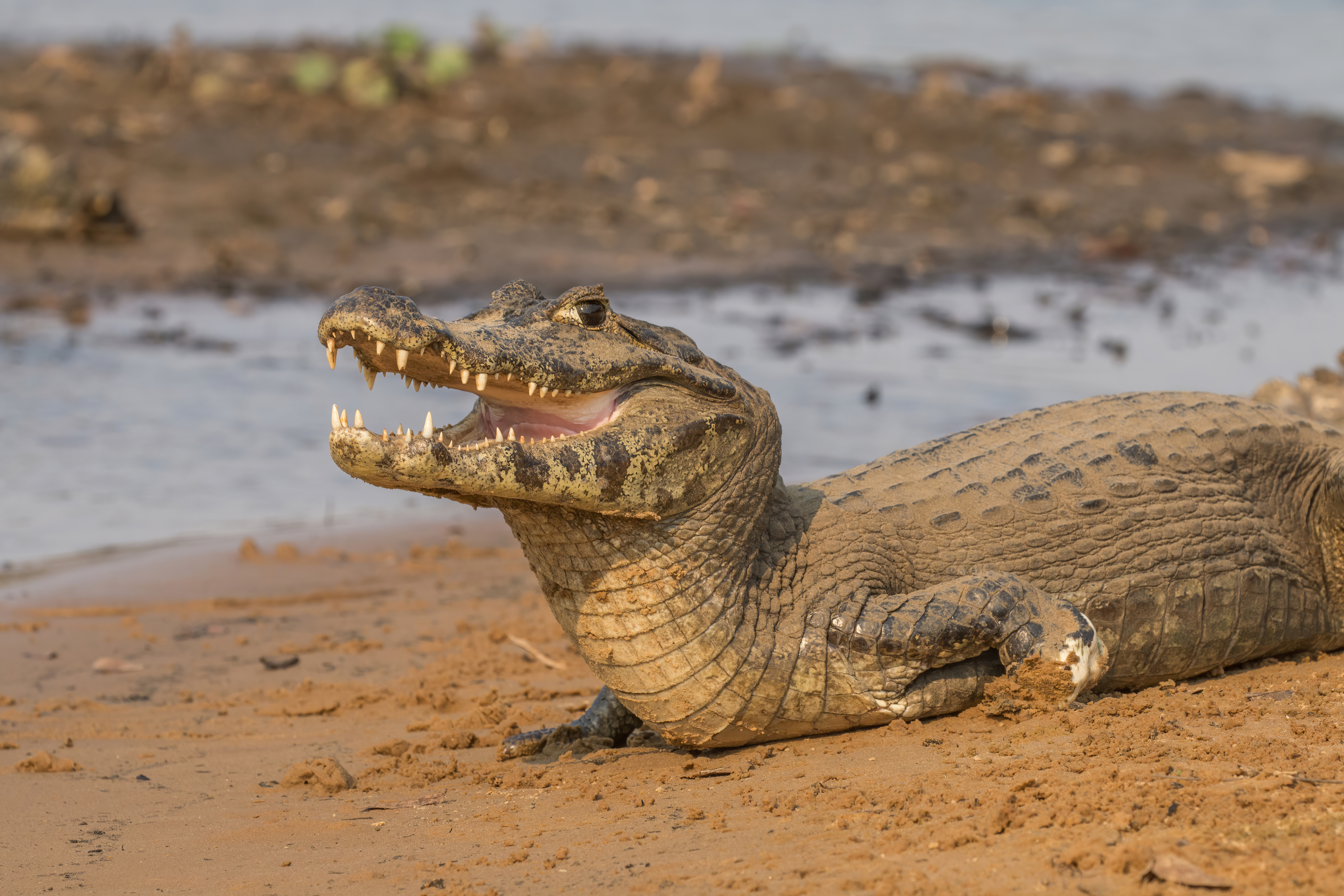
Trilophosuchus may have held its head more raised than other crocodilians, which has been compared to basking caimans.

In many aspects the jaw musculature of Trilophosuchus compares well with that of modern crocodilians, with one of the more notable departures being caused by the shape of the supratemporal fenestrae. Due to them being much narrower than in extant forms, Trilophosuchus would rely much more heavily on the musculature of the pterygoid. More substantial are the changes to the neck musculature. The inclination of the back of the skull causes a notable shift in orientation for the musculature that flexes the head ventrally (down) and further indicates that the spinal column would likewise be positioned further down relative to the head. One of the muscles responsible for moving the head side to side in modern crocodiles (the M. obliquus capitis magnus) appears to be relatively poorly developed in Trilophosuchus, with lateral movement instead being more prominently controlled by the longissimus capitis, pars transversalis capitis muscle. The M. spinalis capitis and M. rectus capitis posterior, two muscles responsible for lifting and rotating the head, are positioned higher above the occipital condyle, effectively allowing Trilophosuchus to lift the head with more power.

All of these combined gives several clues as to how Trilophosuchus differed in its posture and lifestyle from modern crocodiles. The inclination of the posterior skull and the neck musculature indicates that this genus held its head higher above the body than most modern taxa, with Willis comparing it to basking caimans and agamid lizards. Modern crocodiles have strong obliquus capitis magnus muscle, which allow them to overcome the resistance of the surrounding water when moving their head side to side during hunting. However, as this muscle is only poorly developed in Trilophosuchus, the animal likely didn't have to deal with the same resistances as today's crocs and subsequently needed less power to begin shaking its head. Despite this, the well developed longissimus capitis, pars transversalis capitis muscle indicate that side to side movement was nonetheless important, as this muscle functions to maintain rapid lateral motion while feeding. Similar conclusions were previously reached by Busbey in 1977 in regards to Boverisuchus, a terrestrial eusuchian from the Paleogene.

Another possible method of determining the paleoecology of Trilophosuchus would be to compare it with other, better understood forms. In the original description of Trilophosuchus, Willis briefly touches upon the similarities between Trilophosuchus and the modern dwarf caimans and crocodiles, but notes that at that time information was inconsistent. Due to this Willis did not pursue the comparison any further. Instead, Willis looked to older forms like notosuchians and protosuchids, which are generally considered to be terrestrial animals based on not only their skulls but also their limb proportions. As Willis considered Trilophosuchus to have been more similar to these forms than to modern dwarf species, he tentatively suggested that Trilophosuchus was a terrestrial animal. This hypothesis aligns with what other authors have suggested for the mekosuchines most closely related to Trilophosuchus. Molnar, Worthy and Willis suggested that Volia from Fiji was terrestrial based on the lack of other land predators and the anatomy of the ulnare, while terrestrial or semi-terrestrial habits are widely inferred for Mekosuchus based on a variety of factors.

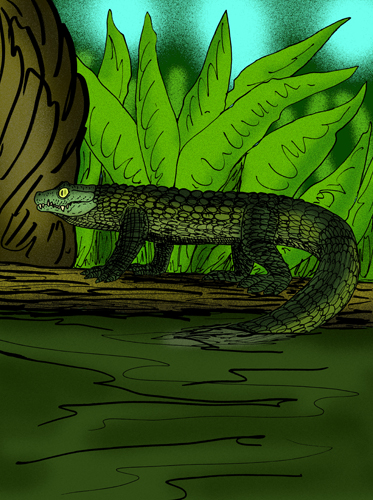
It is currently unclear how Trilophosuchus differed from Mekosuchus in its niche.

Willis also compares Trilophosuchus to Boverisuchus and Sebecus, two terrestrial crocodylomorphs from the early Cenozoic, noting major differences in the shape of the rostrum. While the latter have deeper and more elongated jaws and grow notably larger, Trilophosuchus was small with a boxy skull, a sign that it did not inhabit the same niche even if it was terrestrial. Willis proposes that the difference between these large terrestrial crocodylomorphs and Trilophosuchus may be analogues to the differences between large monitor lizards like the Komodo dragon and small agamas and iguanas. This would suggest that Trilophosuchus was restricted to small prey, fitting its small body size.

Beyond the overall morphology, clues towards Trilophosuchus' ecology have also been drawn from the shape of its brain. Several researchers for instance have previously found a correlation between the cranial pneumaticity and aspects of the respective animal's lifestyle, which is briefly discussed by Ristevski and colleagues while describing the neuroanatomy of Trilophosuchus. Uniquely, Trilophosuchus displays a general mix of features found in Crocodylia and features found in much more basal groups. The overall shape of the endocast has been compared most closely to the terrestrial notosuchian Araripesuchus, while the ratios between the elements of the inner ear shows similarities to some baurusuchids and sphenosuchians among others. The highly pneumatized skull of Trilophosuchus once again mirrors the condition of Paleosuchus, Osteolaemus and various notosuchians, while poorly pneumatized skulls on the other hand appear prominently in highly aquatic forms with slender snouts and powerful abductor muscles, such as thalattosuchians and dyrosaurids. Ristevski concludes from this that Trilophosuchus may have been ecologically similar to today's dwarf crocodilians while being overall more terrestrial than any extant crocodilian.

=== Paleoenvironment ===
As a species native to what is now the Riversleigh World Heritage Area, Trilophosuchus was part of a highly diverse crocodilian fauna. Both the Hiatus Site and the Ringtail Site have yielded multiple crocodilians of different size and shape, whose coexistence is generally easily explained by niche partitioning. For instance, the Ringtail Site also preserves the bones of Baru, a large semi-aquatic ambush predator that is unlikely to have competed for the same resources as the much smaller Trilophosuchus. Not as easily explained is the apparent coexistence of Trilophosuchus and Mekosuchus sanderi. Although known primarily from fragmentary remains, Mekosuchus is also thought to have been a terrestrial animal with an altirostral (high) skull. It is thus unclear how the two would have differed in their ecology. Although it is possible that both genera inhabited different areas and only ended up in the same deposits during preservation (thanatocoenosis), this possibility is deemed less likely due to the composition of the mammal fauna indicating a singular origin for the different fossils. The alternative explanation would be that Trilophosuchus and Mekosuchus may have differed significantly enough in parts of their anatomy that are not currently known, allowing them to exploit different niches.

The Ringtail Site is currently interpreted as a preserving what was once a pool located in a forested karst terrain, preserving primarily aquatic animals that, aside from the crocodilians, includes lungfish, chelid turtles and the extinct platypus Obdurodon dicksoni. Terrestrial animals are known in the form of possums, which gave the site its name and are indicative of trees being present around the pool.
