= Thanatocoenosis =

Thanatocoenosis (from Greek language thanatos - death and koinos - common) are all the embedded fossils at a single discovery site. This site may be referred to as a "death assemblage". Such groupings are composed of fossils of organisms which may not have been associated during life, often originating from different habitats. Examples include marine fossils having been brought together by a water current or animal bones having been deposited by a predator. A site containing thanatocoenosis elements can also lose clarity in its faunal history by more recent intruding factors such as burrowing microfauna or stratigraphic disturbances born from anthropogenic methods.

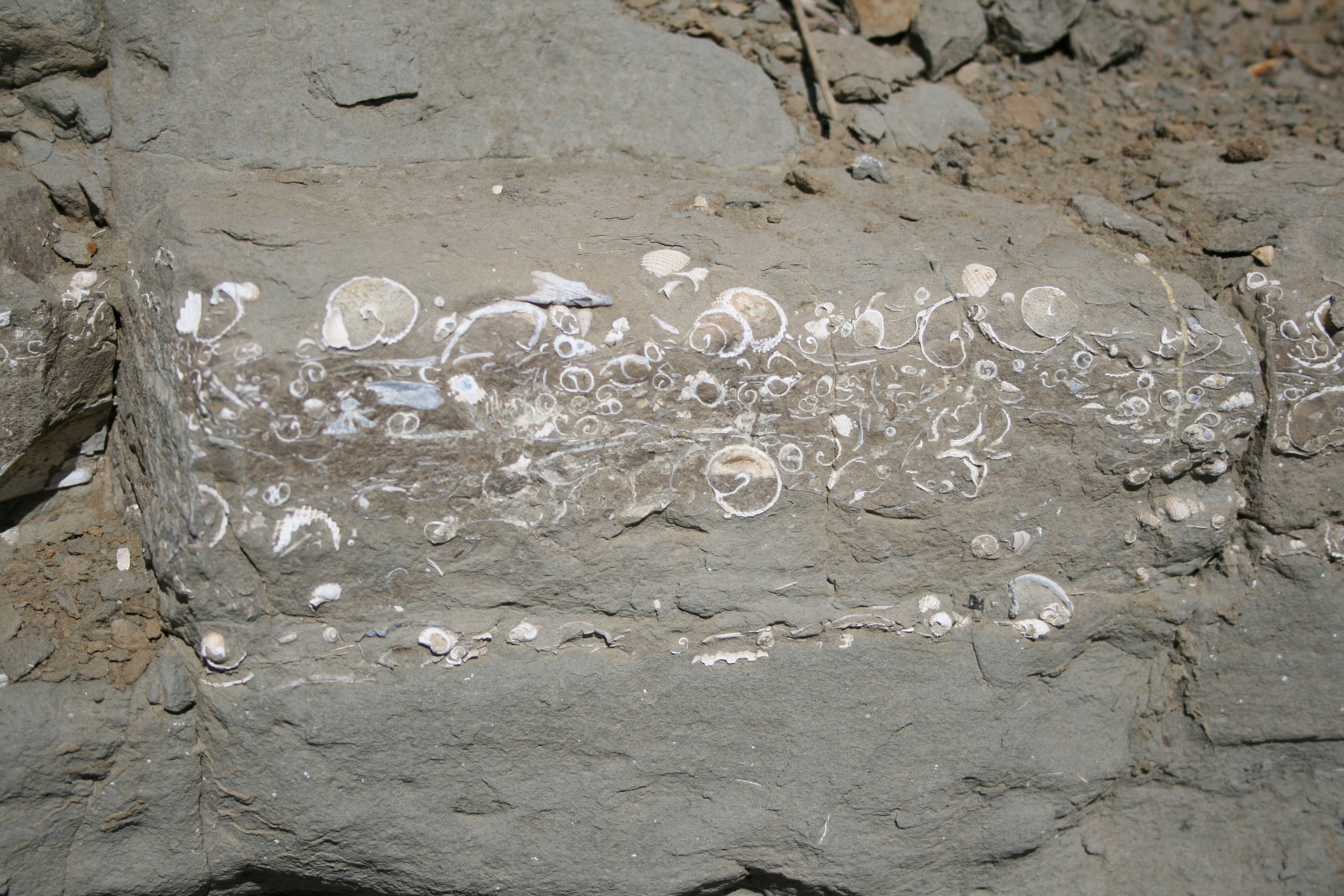
A rock strata within the Año Nuevo State Reserve in California displaying a fossil assemblage.

This term differs from a related term, biocoenosis, which refers to an assemblage in which all organisms within the community interacted and lived together in the same habitat while alive. A biocoenosis can lead to a thanatocoenosis if disrupted significantly enough to have its dead/fossilized matter scattered. A death community/thanatocoenosis is developed by multiple taphonomic processes (those being ones relating to the different ways in which organismal remains pass through strata and are decomposed and preserved) that are generally categorized into two groups: biostratinomy and diagenesis. As a whole, thanatocoenoses are divided into two categories as well: autochthonous and allochthonous.

Death assemblages and thanatocoenoses can provide insight into the process of early-stage fossilization, as well as information about the species within a given ecosystem. The study of taphonomy can aid in furthering the understanding of the ecological past of species and their fossil records if used in conjunction with research on death assemblages from modern ecosystems.

== History ==
The term "thanatocoenosis" was originally created by Erich Wasmund in 1926, and he was the first to define both the similarities and contrasts between these death communities and biocoenoses. Due to confusion between some distinctions between the two, another researcher, Horst Böger, later classified them further in 1970. Similarly to how the term "biotope" describes biocoenosis, a term analogous to thanatocoenosis, "thanatope", was also created and utilized in related literature. Wasmund proffered that the terms thanatope and biotope were congruent to one another, so long as a death community is autochthonous, but that has since been refuted based on the differences regarding the formation factors involved with the two terms.

== See also ==
- Biocoenosis, a life assemblage
- Fossils, preserved remains of once-living organisms from past age
- Taphonomy, the study of decomposition and fossilization
- Biotope, an ecological habitat supporting multiple species
