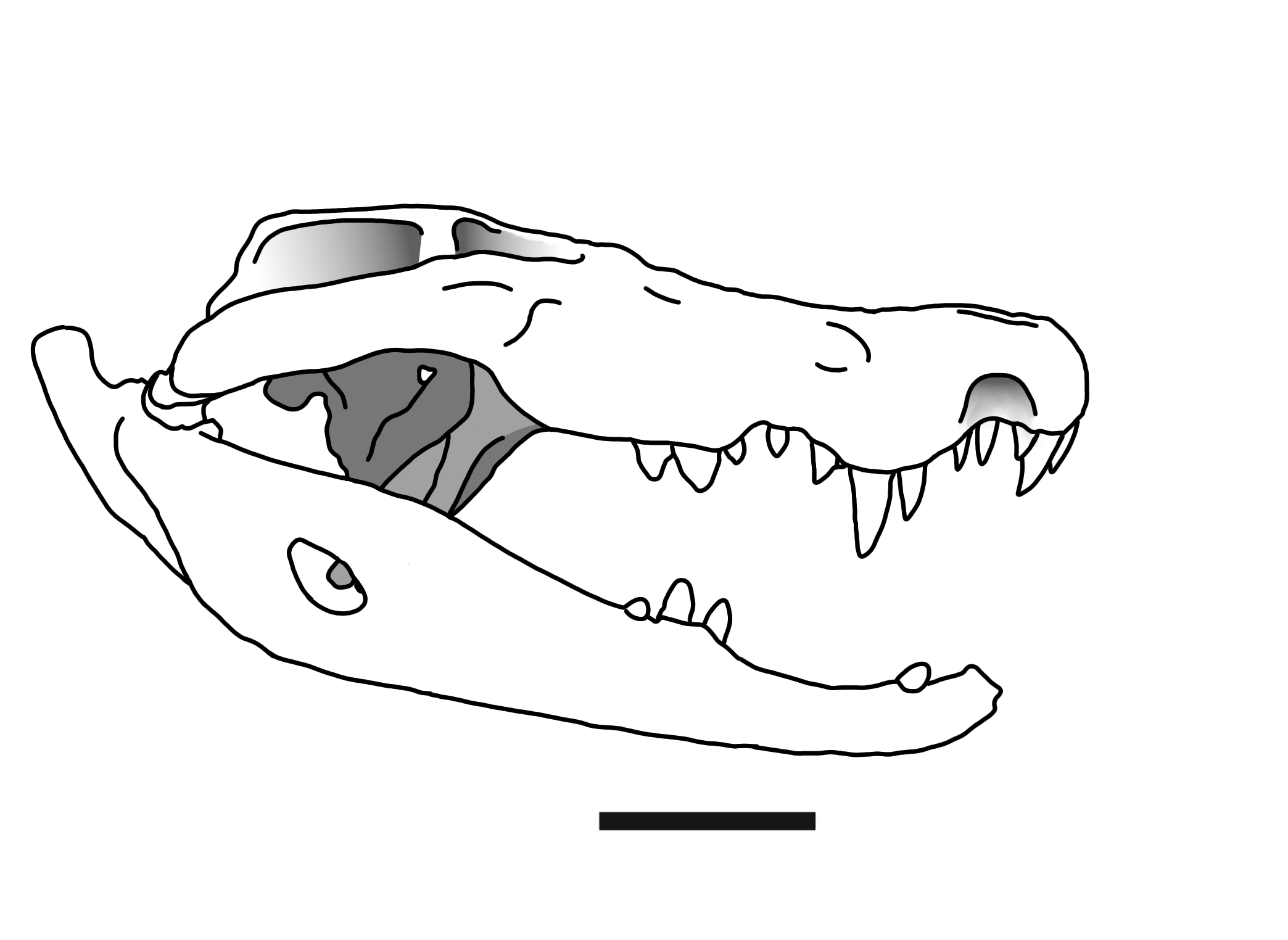
- Holotype skull of Kinyang mabokoensi

Scientific classification
- Kingdom: Animalia
- Phylum: Chordata
- Class: Reptilia
- Order: Crocodylia
- Family: Crocodylidae
- Subfamily: Osteolaeminae
- Genus: †Kinyang; Brochu et al., 2022

Type species
- Kinyang mabokoensis Brochu et al., 2022

Other species
- K. tchernovi Brochu et al., 2022

= Kinyang (reptile) =

Kinyang Temporal range: Early - Middle Miocene 18–14.7 Ma

Extinct genus of reptiles

Kinyang is an extinct genus of osteolaemine crocodile from the Early to Middle Miocene of Kenya. Two species are currently known, K. mabokoensis from the Lake Victoria basin and K. tchernovi from the Lake Victoria and Lake Turkana basins. Kinyang had an exceptionally broad and robust skull, much wider than that of any living crocodile species. This might have allowed it to attack and kill prey its own size or even bigger. Kinyang is notably larger than its contemporary relative Brochuchus. While the precise reasons for the extinction of Kinyang are not known, it coincides with a larger faunal turnover that saw osteolaemines replaced by the still dominant crocodylines. One reason for this shift may have been the drying climate of Africa at the time, which caused rainforests to be replaced by more open environments and disrupted the nesting behavior of osteolaemines due to their dependence on foliage.

== History and naming ==
The fossils of Kinyang were discovered in various locations across Kenya, in particular sediments around Lake Victoria and Lake Turkana. The fossils were described in 2022 as a distinct genus of osteolaemine crocodile. The type species is K. mabokoensis, described on the basis of a complete skull with jaws (KNM-MB 29176) as well as multiple referred specimens all discovered in the middle Miocene Maboko Formation (Maboko Island, Lake Victoria). Dating of these sediments indicate an age between 15.4 and 14.7 Ma.

The second species, K. tchernovi, was named the same year based on an incomplete skull from the Lokone Formation in the southwest of Lake Turkana, while several referred specimens were found at sites near Lake Victoria. Both the Lake Turkana and Lake Victoria material suggest an age older than that of K. mabokoensis, with analysis indicating that they are over 17 million years old. Some remains from Chianda (Uyoma Peninsula) and the Lothidok Formation (Turkana Basin) cannot confidently be referred to either species.

The word "crocodile" has various different translations among the many Nilotic languages spoken in East Africa. In Turkana, crocodiles are called "akinyang", in Dholuo "nyang", in Bari "kinio", in Samburu "lkinian" and in the Maa language they are known as "lkinyang". The name Kinyang is a derivative of the same base word these individual names stem from. K. mabokoensis was named for Maboko Island, while K. tchernovi was named after Dr. Eitan Tchernov, who has conducted extensive research on the crocodiles of North and East Africa.

== Description ==
Kinyang is recognized by its broad and deep skull and superficially short rostrum as well as inflated premaxillae. Although the rostrum appears short on first glance, it is proportionally only little shorter than what is seen in the similarly sized Nile crocodiles. The shortened appearance is instead the result of the incredibly wide rostrum, which is broader than that of any modern crocodile. Kinyang shows a width to length ratio of 0.72 at the back of the skull and 0.53 at the level of the fifth maxillary tooth. Compared to this, Nile crocodiles show ratios of only 0.52 and 0.28 in these respective areas. The palatine process is unique among all crocodiles, its margins converging towards the front where the bone is flattened. Compared to modern crocodiles, Kinyang also has a much simpler occlusion of the teeth. Crocodylids have extensive occlusal pits located between the first and sixth maxillary tooth, but in Kinyang these pits can only be found between the six and eighth tooth of the maxilla. Such a pattern is typically observed in species transitioning from the ancestral overbite to an interlocking dentition pattern as seen in most modern taxa. With this, Kinyang is among the few known examples of a crocodylid returning from interlocking dentition to a partial overbite, another instance of this being found in the Australian mekosuchines. Overall, the number of maxillary teeth observed in the fossils ranges from twelve to thirteen teeth. Fewer than seen in modern crocodylids (fourteen), and more consistent with Voay and Osteolaemus. Although tooth count may vary in crocodylids, it is usually a minor difference of one tooth position less, not more. Additionally, in such instances, the difference is typically caused by the lack of a tooth in only one of the toothrows, making the tooth count asymmetrical. Due to this, Brochu and his team argue that despite ranging between twelve and thirteen teeth, Kinyang would not have had fourteen or more. The maxillary alveoli are generally larger and more tightly packed than in other crocodylids and especially Brochuchus, with its widely spaced small teeth. In both species, the quadratojugal extends far towards the rear end of the infratemporal fenestra, largely blocking the quadrate bone from contributing to its margin. This is a strange feature found across multiple not especially closely related crocodile species including the Paleoafrican species of Crocodylus, Crocodylus checchiai, Osteolaemus, the New Guinea crocodile and the Borneo crocodile. One feature that is unique to Kinyang is the fact that the lateral collateral ligament, located towards the back of the mandible, is additionally divided. What function this serves is however unclear.

It is noted in the type description that although subtle, the differences between Kinyang mabokoensis and Kinyang tchernovi are consistently observed. Notably, the type species has wider supratemporal fenestrae, while K. tchernovi has fenestrae that are more elongated. Although the proportions of the fenestrae may change during growth, Brochu and colleagues argue that this is not a deciding factor here, as K. tchernovi preserves skulls both larger and smaller than the K. mabokoensis holotype preserving the same fenestrae proportions. Taphonomic distortion is also ruled out as only one of these skulls suffered from crushing. The opening of the nares also differs. In Kinyang mabokoensis, the nares open upwards, while they open more towards the front in Kinyang tchernovi.

== Phylogeny ==
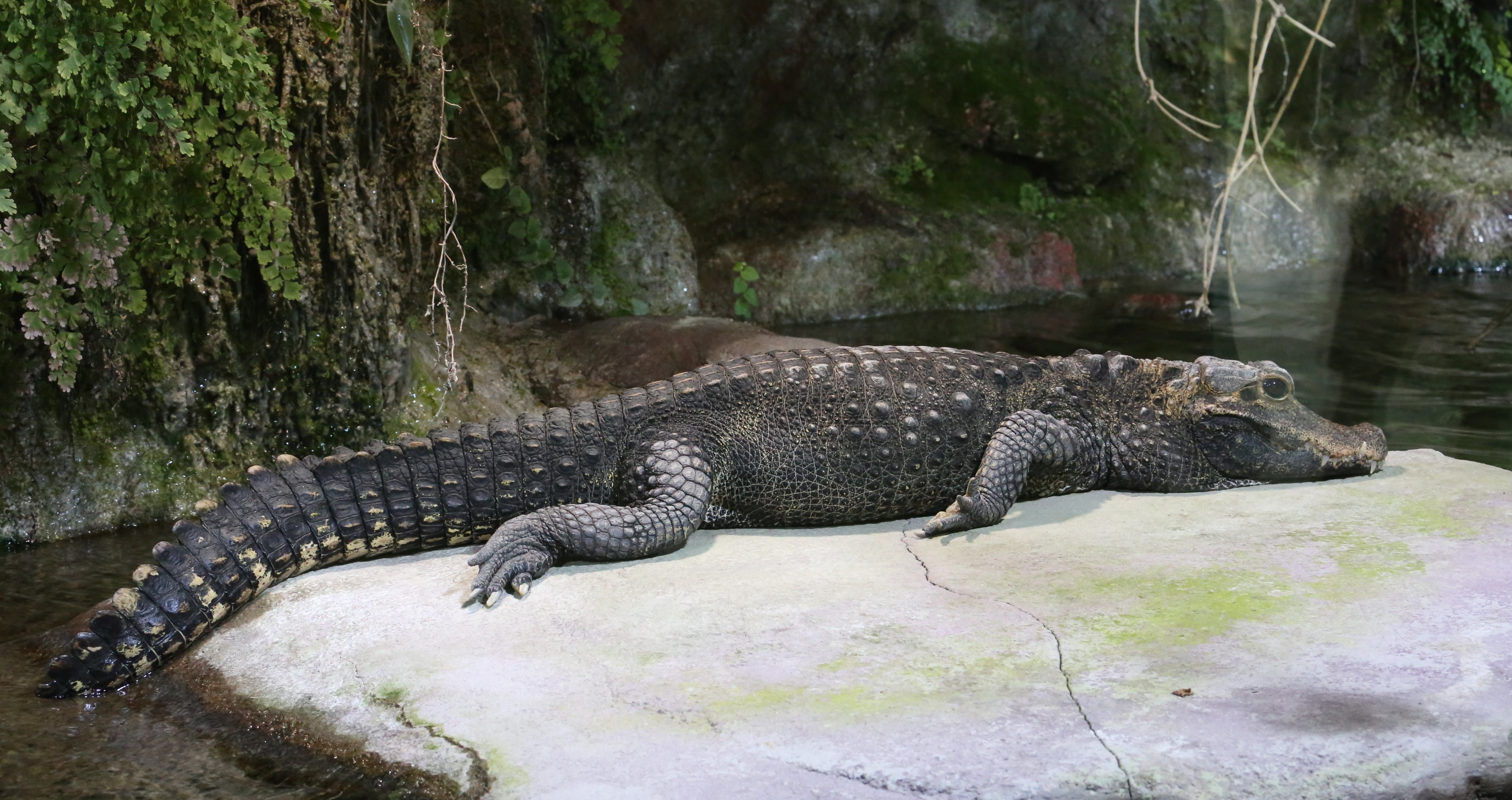
Kinyang was an osteolaemine, a group that includes the dwarf crocodile

The contact between the frontal bone and the parietals is straight as observed in various other known and putative osteolaemines such as Rimasuchus, "Crocodylus" gariepensis, Voay and Brochuchus. It also preserves the choanal neck that is characteristic to osteolaemines, although the crest of this character is not as pronounced as in other genera. To determine the relationship between Kinyang and other crocodylids, both a maximum parsimony analysis and a Bayesian inference analysis were conducted. While the former was based on the morphological dataset established by Brochu in 2012, the later combined morphological and genetic information as previously done by Hekkala et al. (2021), except now substituting a morphological data set published by Lee and Yates (2018) with that of Brochu. The following tree shows the strict consensus of six equally optimal trees if the incompletely known Aldabrachampsus is excluded from the analysis, as its inclusion leads to loss of topology.

- Crocodylidae
  - Osteolaeminae
    - Osteolaemini
      - Rimasuchus lloydi †
      - - Voay robustus †
        - - Osteolaemus osborni Osborn’s dwarf crocodile
          - Osteolaemus tetraspis dwarf crocodile
    - Euthecodontini
      - - Kinyang mabokoensis †
        - Kinyang tchernovi †
      - - "Crocodylus" gariepensis †
        - - - Brochuchus pigotti †
            - Brochuchus parvidens †
          - - Euthecodon arambourgi †
            - Euthecodon brumpti †
  - Crocodylinae
    - - Mecistops cataphractus West African slender-snouted crocodile
      - Mecistops leptorhynchus Central African slender-snouted crocodile
    - Crocodylus spp.

The Bayesian analysis shows a notable loss in resolution, still recovering Kinyang as an osteolaemine but seated in a large polytomy that consists of Voay, Rimasuchus, osteolaemines, the Euthecodontini, Crocodylus and Mecistops. Brochu et al. argues that there may be multiple reasons for these results. On the one hand, the exclusion of Gavialis and Alligator may have affected the results. Another reason may be the change in morphological dataset, now favoring an osteolaemine Voay, but overall only recovering Kinyang as the only unambiguous osteolaemine besides the extant dwarf crocodiles themselves.

- Crocodylidae
  - Rimasuchus lloydi †
  - Voay robustus †
  - - - Osteolaemus osborni Osborn’s dwarf crocodile
      - Osteolaemus tetraspis dwarf crocodile
    - - Kinyang mabokoensis †
      - Kinyang tchernovi †
  - - - Aldabrachampsus dilophus †
      - "Crocodylus" gariepensis †
    - - - Brochuchus pigotti †
        - Brochuchus parvidens †
      - - Euthecodon arambourgi †
        - Euthecodon brumpti †
  - Crocodylus spp.
  - - Mecistops cataphractus West African slender-snouted crocodile
    - Mecistops leptorhynchus Central African slender-snouted crocodile

The scientists describing Kinyang acknowledge that support for the genus nesting in Euthecodontini is relatively weak and that it would take little to place it at the base of Osteolaeminae, only increasing the tree length by a single step. Part of the issue with determining the phylogenetic relations of this group is the highly derived nature of many of its members, differing greatly from their ancestral state and making analysis difficult. Brochu and his colleagues note that they deem the results recovered by the Bayesian analysis with skepticism.

== Paleobiology ==
=== Paleoenvironment ===
The sediments of the Maboko Formation indicate that Kinyang mabokoensis fossils were deposited at the shore of a lake of unknown dimensions, likely surrounded by open forest and woodland based on analysis of mammal teeth from the area, which furthermore indicate the absence of C4 grasses. Younger beds of the formation indicate the presence of C3 grasses in bed 4 (directly overlying the strata Kinyang mabokoensis was found in) and even younger strata show an even wetter, more open woodland environment inhabited by various water birds (storks, pelicans, flamingos and cormorants) as well as a great abundance of indetermined crocodile teeth. Like Brochuchus, Kinyang is also known from other riparian woodlands and mixed open environments.

=== Paleoecology ===
The skull of Kinyang shows several unique traits and proportions not found in any modern crocodile, suggesting that it was a highly specialized animal with no proper modern analog to compare it to. However, some clues can be taken from the overall skull shape. According to Drumheller and Wilberg, broad-snouted crocodiles can be split into species with V-shaped snouts (generalists feeding on diverse prey items up to their own size) and species wider, less triangular snouts. The later group, to which Kinyang would belong to, being generalist feeders preying on animals as big or even bigger than themselves.

=== Extinction ===
The presence of Kinyang both at Lake Victoria and Lake Turkana supports the idea that the crocodilian fauna in East Africa was relatively uniform across Kenya. Although Euthecodon does not entirely match this hypothesis, as it only appears around Lake Turkana later into the Miocene, Brochu argues that the lack of early Miocene remains is most likely caused by poor sampling. Kinyang may also play a key role in the understanding of the faunal turnover that occurred during the Miocene. A distinct shift can be observed when comparing the early and middle Miocene crocodile fauna, consisting of osteolaemines such as Brochuchus and Kinyang, with the fauna of the later Miocene, now preserving Mecistops and Crocodylus. This shows a clear change from osteolaemines to possible crocodylines, with the later taking over the ecological niche of the former. The only consistently present crocodilians were long-snouted forms such as Euthecodon and Eogavialis (Miocene specimens of Mecistops did not possess the same longirostrine proportions as their modern relatives).

The exact reasons for this faunal turnover are however not entirely understood. One hypothesis suggests that the change in the dominant crocodile group was started by aridification and spread of open grassland as opposed to woodland, further accelerated by seasonal rainfall and a change from C3 to C4 grasses. These changes can clearly be observed in the local mammal fauna, which went from being dominated by browsers to a fauna more adapted towards a grazing lifestyle. Modern Osteolaemus and Mecistops are primarily known from lowland forests and rain forests, but can also occur in seasonal wetlands and riparian woodlands. Assuming that extant and extinct osteolaemines share similar habitat preferences, it is possible that the extinction of Kinyang may be tied to the disappearance of these forests, which then allowed more resilient crocodylines to take over. Mecistops may represent an issue with this hypothesis, however, as it is known from much younger deposits around Lake Turkana despite sharing similar environmental preferences as dwarf crocodiles. While not as common as other late Miocene crocodiles of the region, its presence does not match the idea that habitat loss caused the disappearance of Kinyang and other osteolaemines from the area.

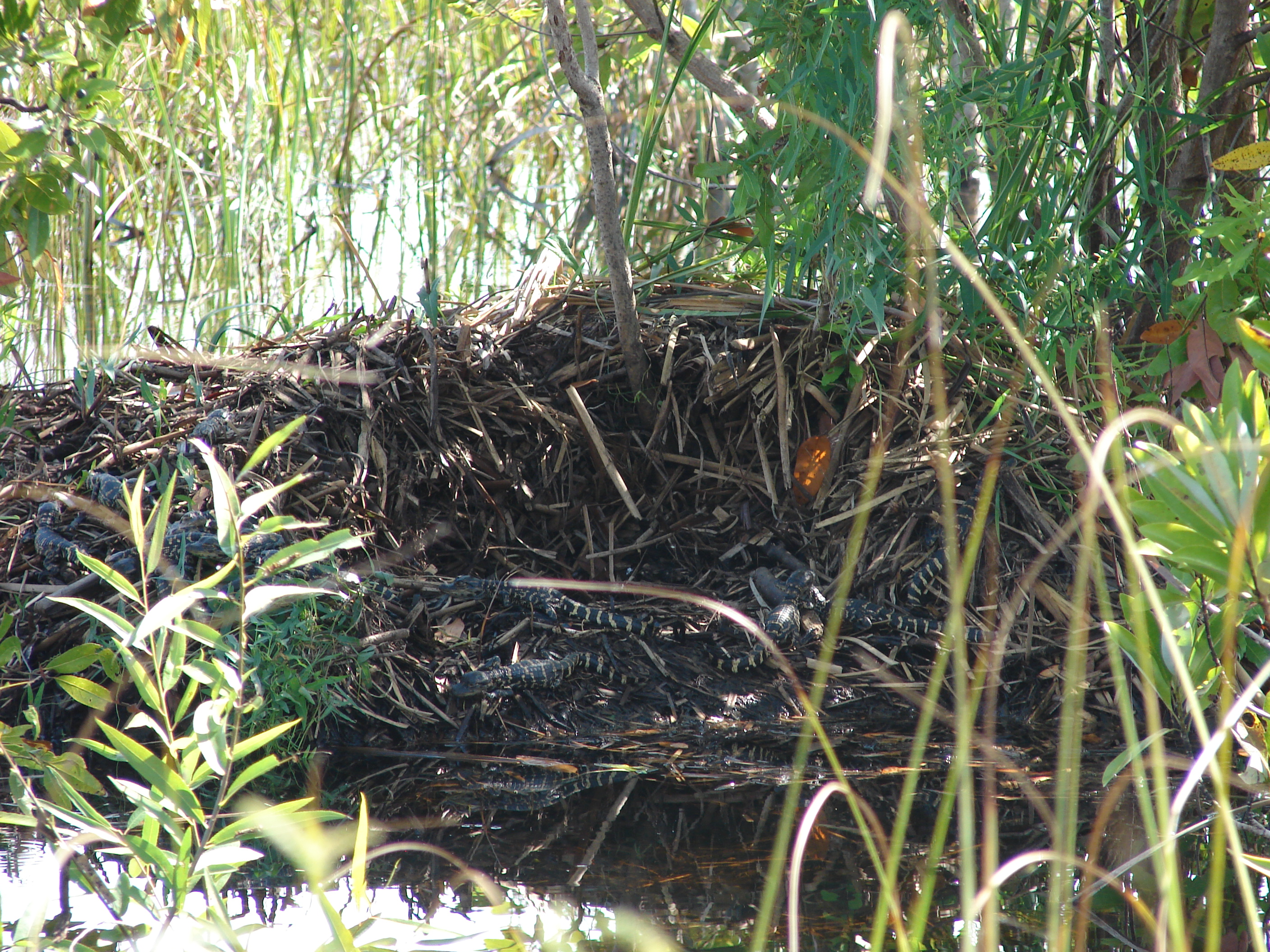
Some crocodilians (like Alligators) build nests primarily composed of vegetation

Besides the connection between vegetation and prey as well as habitat, a change in plant life could have also heavily affected the nesting habits of the East African crocodiles. Both slender-snouted crocodiles and dwarf crocodiles show high degrees of specialization when it comes to nest building, creating mounds that largely consist of plant material to protect and warm their eggs. The exact shape and size of the nests depends on various factors including available vegetation and water levels and additionally differs between the two genera in areas where they coexist. Dwarf crocodiles prefer to nest in swamp environments while slender-snouted crocodiles nest close to riverbanks. Accordingly, a shift in vegetation and environment could have just as much impacted the nesting habitats of the Miocene osteolaemines found in East Africa and caused them to be replaced by species better adapted at making their nests in pits in the sediment, such as Crocodylus and gharials. Mecistops being less dependent on wetlands to create their nests may also explain how they survived for longer around Lake Turkana.

However, the connection between the aridification of East Africa, the end of the Miocene Climatic Optimum and the disappearance of Kinyang is obscured by a large gap in the stratigraphy of the region. This leaves the exact time span between the last recorded appearance of the taxon and its actual extinction uncertain. Additionally, it is noted that several other factors could have contributed to the changing climate and that entirely separate factors may have been just as important to the faunal turnover. Increased tectonic and volcanic activity had begun to shape the Rift Valley during this time and may have heavily influenced the drainage of rivers and caused the creation of deep lakes. Ultimately, the faunal turnover may have been a multi-faceted process influenced by changes in vegetation, environment and the tectonic activity of the Rift Valley. The discovery of additional crocodilian material bridging the gap between osteolaemine dominated wetlands and those dominated by crocodylines could however shed light on the exact processes that caused this shift.
