= Antecrocodylus =

Antecrocodylus Temporal range: Middle Miocene

Scientific classification
- Kingdom: Animalia
- Phylum: Chordata
- Class: Reptilia
- Order: Crocodilia
- Genus: †Antecrocodylus Martin et al., 2023

Type species
- †Antecrocodylus chiangmuanensis Martin et al., 2023

Extinct genus of reptiles

Antecrocodylus is a genus of crocodilian from the middle Miocene of Chiang Muan and Mae Moh, Thailand. The holotype consists of the back of the skull and an associated mandible. While far from complete and heavily damaged, the material highlights how little is known about the crocodylid fauna of Miocene Asia. Furthermore, Antecrocodylus was recovered as the basalmost member of Crocodylidae, having diverged before osteolaemines and crocodylines split from one another. This may suggest that it could provide significant information regarding the origins and evolution of modern crocodiles.

== History and naming ==
The holotype CMMC22, a partial skull lacking the snout, was discovered southeast of Chiang Mai in the Chiang Muan mine. The remains were recovered by a worker in 1999 from just beneath the lowest lignite seam and have been dated to the Serravallian stage of the Miocene. Additional remains possibly belonging to this animal were discovered in Mae Moh mine (Na Khaem Formation), a second deposit of vertebrate fossils that, much like that of the Chiang Muan mine, was unearthed thanks to the industrial mining of lignite. However, while the crushed holotype is comparably complete, these referred specimens are primarily isolated bones such as a piece of the quadratojugal-jugal contact and some postcranial remains including a shoulder blade and vertebrae. While overlap is minute, some distinct anatomical traits suggest that the fossils from both sites belonged to a single taxon.

The name Antecrocodylus was chosen by Jeremy Martin and colleagues in reference to the animal's suspected phylogenetic position in relation to modern crocodiles, whereas the species name derives from the mine where the holotype was discovered.

== Description ==
The eyes of Antecrocodylus were relatively widely spaced and a shallow knob was present between the orbits where the frontal bone meets the postorbital bones, similar to what is seen in modern Siamese crocodiles. The frontal bone is relatively smooth and does not possess a ridge, crest or any other major ornamentations. The supratemporal fenestrae, openings in the skull table, were rather small and circular in shape. The skull table itself is flat and does not show any horns or crests, nor does it form a sagittal crest as in Siamese crocodiles. The back-most ends of the squamosals, called the squamosal prongs, extend much further back than in other crocodilians, but do not quite reach the extent seen in longirostrine (narrow-snouted) forms. The lower temporal fenestrae, or infratemporal fenestrae, are in contact with the suture between the quadratojugal and the quadrate bones, which is located at the lower back corner of the openings. The lower edge of the jugal arch is straight, which sets Antecrocodylus apart from most other modern crocodilians, which have concave jugal arches. In this regard, Antecrocodylus is similar to longirostrine taxa like modern gharials, false gharials and their extinct relatives.

Overall the skull is typical for a semi-aquatic Eusuchian, being flattened with eye sockets that are directed upwards.

== Phylogeny ==
While similar to gharials in possessing a straight lower margin of the jugal arch, other anatomical features of Antecrocodylus clearly show that it was a member of the Crocodyloidea, not the Gavialoidea. More specifically, phylogenetic analysis suggests that it was a basal member of the Crocodylidae, falling just outside of the two extant subfamilies Osteolaeminae (dwarf and slender-snouted crocodiles) and Crocodylinae (true crocodiles). This also means that Antecrocodylus was more closely related to modern crocodiles than members of the family Mekosuchinae, which was found in Australia during most of the Cenozoic.

Two of the resulting phylogenetic trees of Martin et al. are featured below, showing the results with and without molecular constraint. While this affected the position of some taxa, namely whether or not slender-snouted crocodiles, Voay and "Crocodylus" gariepensis were recovered as osteolaemines or crocodylines, the different methods did not have an effect on the position held by Antecrocodylus.

- Crocodyloidea
  - "Crocodylus" megarhinus
  - Mekosuchinae
    - Kambara implexidens
    - - Trilophosuchus rackhami
      - Australosuchus clarkae
  - - Antecrocodylus chiangmuanensis
    - Crocodylidae
      - Osteolaeminae
        - Mecistops cataphractus
        - - Rimasuchus lloydi
          - - Osteolaemus spp.
            - - Brochuchus pigotti
              - Euthecodon spp.
      - Crocodylinae
        - - "Crocodylus" gariepensis
          - Voay robustus
        - Crocodylus spp.

- Crocodyloidea
  - "Crocodylus" megarhinus
  - Mekosuchinae
    - Kambara implexidens
    - - Trilophosuchus rackhami
      - Australosuchus clarkae
  - - Antecrocodylus chiangmuanensis
    - Crocodylidae
      - Osteolaeminae
        - Rimasuchus lloydi
        - - Osteolaemus spp.
          - Voay robustus
        - - "Crocodylus" gariepensis
          - - Brochuchus pigotti
            - Euthecodon spp.
      - Crocodylinae
        - Mecistops cataphractus
        - Crocodylus spp.

== Evolutionary importance ==
Martin and colleagues suggest that the discovery of Antecrocodylus may be an important clue in deciphering the history and origins of the genus Crocodylus. For one, they note that Asia is critical in understanding where the genus actually originated, with the two most common hypotheses being an African origin and an Australasian origin, the later being favoured by researchers like Oaks who refuted the out-of-Africa model. At the same time, it is acknowledged that the fossil record of Asian crocodilians is much poorer than that of other parts of the world, especially in regards to the Miocene, a crucial period for crocodilian dispersal. South America is well known for its diverse gharial and caiman fauna, North America and Europe were home to a variety of alligatorids, Africa was dominated by osteolaemines and Australia was inhabited by the endemic mekosuchines. However, fossil crocodilians of Miocene Asia are primarily known from tomistomines and poorly understood crocodylids like Crocodylus palaeindicus. This, coupled with the basal position of Antecrocodylus, means that the role of Asia in the origin of Crocodylus remains unresolved. However, Martin and colleagues argue that the discovery of Antecrocodylus highlights that there may still be much left to be discovered in the region, which could shed further light on the matter in the future.
