= "Crocodylus" gariepensis =

"Crocodylus" gariepensis Temporal range: Early Miocene, 17.5 Ma

Scientific classification
- Kingdom: Animalia
- Phylum: Chordata
- Class: Reptilia
- Order: Crocodylia
- Family: Crocodylidae
- Subfamily: Osteolaeminae
- Genus: incertae sedis
- Species: †"Crocodylus" gariepensis

Binomial name
- †"Crocodylus" gariepensis Pickford, 2003

Extinct species of reptile

"Crocodylus" gariepensis is an extinct species of crocodile that lived in southern Africa during the Early Miocene about 17.5 million years ago (Ma). Fossils have been found along a bank of the Orange River in Namibia, near its border with South Africa.

== Classification and phylogeny ==
When the species was named in 2003, it was hypothesized to be ancestral to the living Nile crocodile, Crocodylus niloticus. During this time the fossil record of C. niloticus was thought to extend back into the Late Miocene, meaning that "C." gariepensis could have been a direct precursor to the species. More recent studies propose that C. niloticus first appeared much more recently, making "C." gariepensis an unlikely ancestor of the Nile crocodile. Moreover, the most recent phylogenetic studies of crocodiles place "C." gariepensis in an evolutionary position outside other living species of Crocodylus, far from the position of C. niloticus. Indeed, the species appears to be an osteolaemine more closely related to dwarf crocodiles (Osteolaemus) and possibly slender-snouted crocodiles (Mecistops), as shown in the cladogram below:

- Crocodylidae
  - Osteolaeminae
    - Rimasuchus lloydi†
    - - Voay robustus†
      - - Osteolaemus osborni Osborn’s dwarf crocodile
        - Osteolaemus tetraspis Dwarf crocodile
    - - "Crocodylus" gariepensis†
      - - - Brochuchus parvidens†
          - Brochuchus pigotti†
        - - Euthecodon arambourgi†
          - Euthecodon brumpti†
  - Crocodylinae
    - Mecistops cataphractus West African slender-snouted crocodile
    - - - Crocodylus thorbjarnarsoni†
        - Crocodylus anthropophagus†
      - - Crocodylus niloticus Nile crocodile
        - - Crocodylus checchiai†
          - Crocodylus moreletii Morelet's crocodile
          - Crocodylus intermedius Orinoco crocodile
          - Crocodylus acutus American crocodile
          - Crocodylus rhombifer Cuban crocodile
        - Crocodylus palaeindicus†
        - - Crocodylus palustris Mugger crocodile
          - - - Crocodylus ossifragus†
              - Crocodylus siamensis Siamese crocodile
            - - Crocodylus mindorensis Philippine crocodile
              - Crocodylus johnstoni Freshwater crocodile
              - Crocodylus porosus Saltwater crocodile
              - - Crocodylus raninus Borneo crocodile
                - Crocodylus novaeguineae New Guinea crocodile

== Paleoecology ==
Although much of Namibia is currently arid, "C." gariepensis lived during a time when the local climate was humid and subtropical. It likely inhabited gallery forests surrounding the Orange River. Fossils of giant tortoises and a variety of small burrowing mammals have been found in the same deposits.
