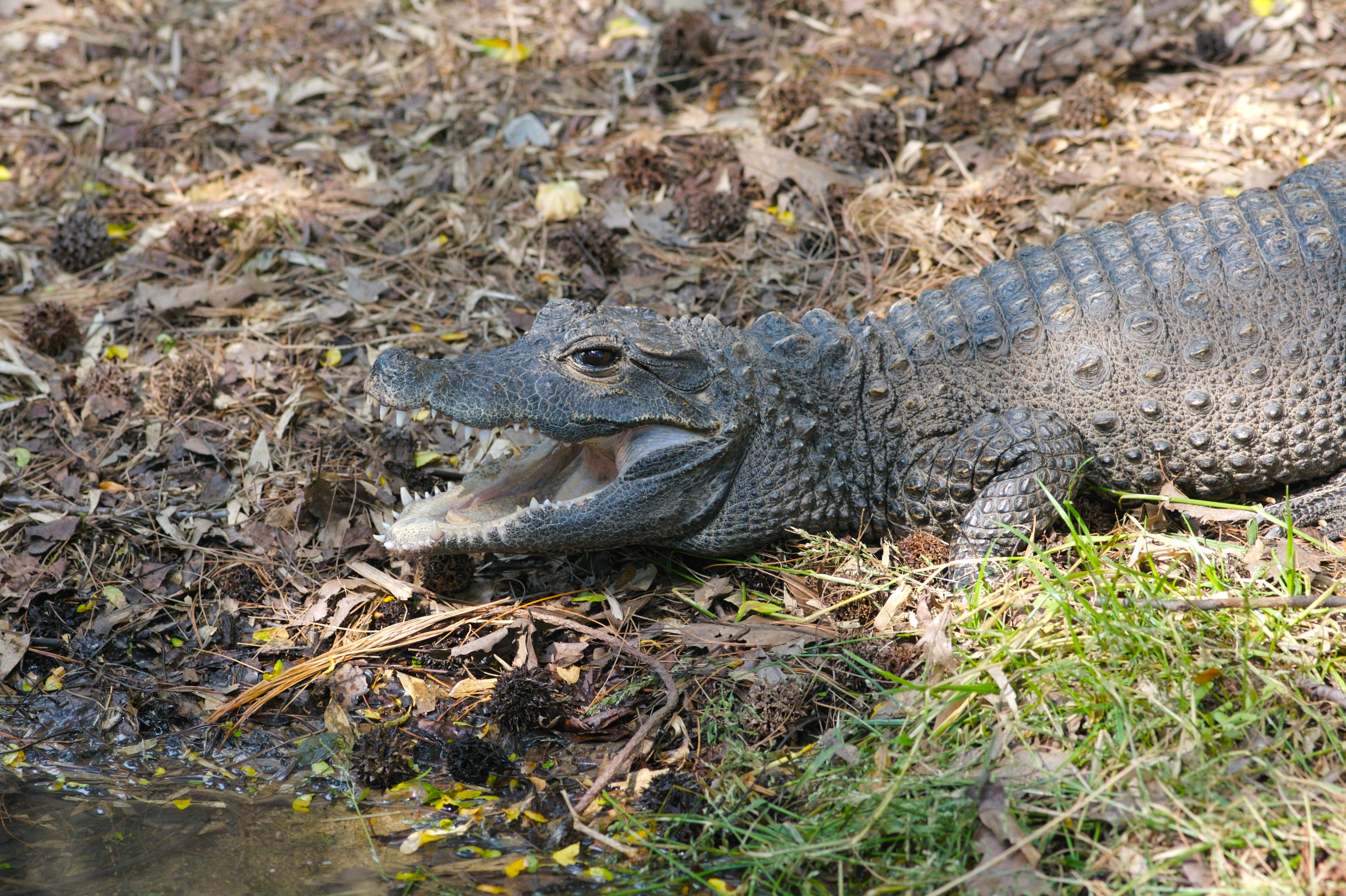
- West African dwarf crocodile (Osteolaemus tetraspis)
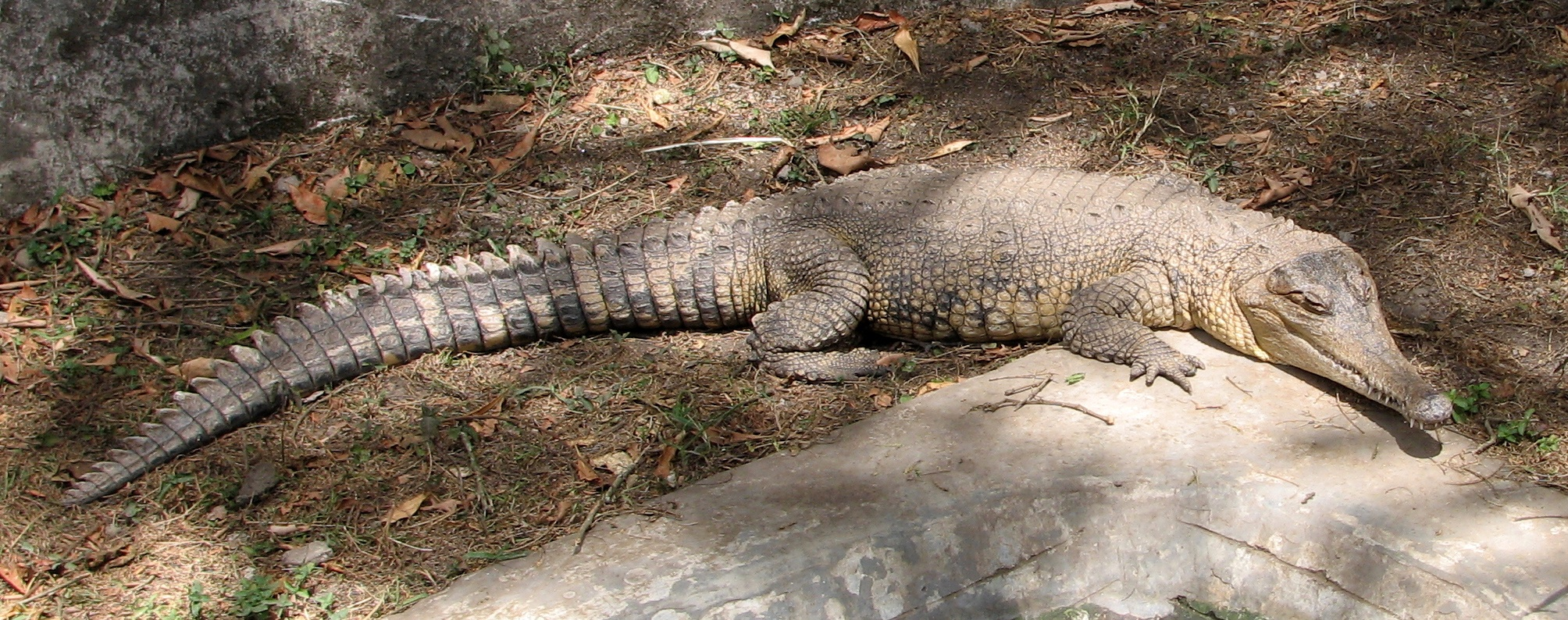
- Central African slender-snouted crocodile (Mecistops leptorhynchus)

Scientific classification
- Kingdom: Animalia
- Phylum: Chordata
- Class: Reptilia
- Clade: Archosauria
- Order: Crocodilia
- Superfamily: Crocodyloidea
- Family: Crocodylidae
- Subfamily: Osteolaeminae; Brochu, 2003

Genera
- Osteolaemus; Mecistops?; †Aldabrachampsus?; †Brochuchus; †Euthecodon; †Kinyang; †Rimasuchus

= Osteolaeminae =

Osteolaeminae Temporal range: Eocene–Holocene, 38–0 Ma

Subfamily of crocodiles

Osteolaeminae (from Ancient Greek όστεον (ósteon), meaning "bone", and λαιμός (laimós), meaning "throat") is a subfamily of true crocodiles within the family Crocodylidae containing the dwarf crocodiles and slender-snouted crocodiles, and is the sister taxon to Crocodylinae.

== Taxonomy ==
Osteolaeminae was named by Christopher Brochu in 2003 as a subfamily of Crocodylidae separate from Crocodylinae, and is cladistically defined as Osteolaemus tetraspis (the Dwarf crocodile) and all crocodylians more closely related to it than to Crocodylus niloticus (the Nile crocodile). This is a stem-based definition, and is the sister taxon to Crocodylinae. Osteolaeminae contains the two extant genera Osteolaemus and Mecistops, along with several extinct genera, although the number of extant species within Osteolaeminae is currently in question.

=== Phylogeny ===
The cladogram below is based on two studies that combined morphological, molecular (DNA sequencing), and stratigraphic (fossil age) data. Recently recognised species (M. leptorhynchus, C. halli and the third Osteolaemus species) placed according to 2023 study by Sales-Oliveira et al.

- Crocodylidae (crown group)
  - Osteolaeminae
    - - - Mecistops cataphractus West African slender-snouted crocodile
        - Mecistops leptorhynchus Central African slender-snouted crocodile
      - Euthecodon †
    - - Brochuchus †
      - - Rimasuchus †
        - - - Osteolaemus osborni Osborn's dwarf crocodile
          - - Osteolaemus tetraspis Dwarf crocodile
            - Osteolaemus sp. West
  - Crocodylinae
    - Voay
      Voay robustus †
    - Crocodylus
      - - - Crocodylus anthropophagus †
          - Crocodylus thorbjarnarsoni †
        - - Crocodylus palaeindicus †
          - Crocodylus Tirari Desert †
      - - - - - - Crocodylus johnstoni Freshwater crocodile
            - - - Crocodylus novaeguineae New Guinea crocodile
                - Crocodylus halli Hall's New Guinea crocodile
              - - Crocodylus mindorensis Philippine crocodile
          - - - - Crocodylus porosus Saltwater crocodile
            - - - Crocodylus siamensis Siamese crocodile
              - - Crocodylus palustris Mugger crocodile
        - - - Crocodylus checchiai †
            - Crocodylus falconensis †
          - - - - - - Crocodylus suchus West African crocodile
            - - - - - Crocodylus niloticus Nile crocodile
              - - - - Crocodylus rhombifer Cuban crocodile
                - - - Crocodylus intermedius Orinoco crocodile
                    - Crocodylus acutus American crocodile
                  - - Crocodylus moreletii Morelet's crocodile

Alternatively, other morphological studies have recovered Mecistops as a basal member of Crocodylinae, more closely related to Crocodylus than to Osteolaemus and the other members of Osteolaeminae, as shown in the cladogram below.

- Crocodylidae
  - Osteolaeminae
    - Rimasuchus lloydi†
    - - Voay robustus†
      - - Osteolaemus osborni Osborn's dwarf crocodile
        - Osteolaemus tetraspis Dwarf crocodile
    - - "Crocodylus" gariepensis†
      - - - Brochuchus parvidens†
          - Brochuchus pigotti†
        - - Euthecodon arambourgi†
          - Euthecodon brumpti†
  - Crocodylinae
    - Mecistops cataphractus West African slender-snouted crocodile
    - - - Crocodylus thorbjarnarsoni†
        - Crocodylus anthropophagus†
      - - Crocodylus niloticus Nile crocodile
        - - Crocodylus checchiai†
          - Crocodylus moreletii Morelet's crocodile
          - Crocodylus intermedius Orinoco crocodile
          - Crocodylus acutus American crocodile
          - Crocodylus rhombifer Cuban crocodile
        - Crocodylus palaeindicus†
        - - Crocodylus palustris Mugger crocodile
          - - - Crocodylus ossifragus†
              - Crocodylus siamensis Siamese crocodile
            - - Crocodylus mindorensis Philippine crocodile
              - Crocodylus johnstoni Freshwater crocodile
              - Crocodylus porosus Saltwater crocodile
              - - Crocodylus raninus Borneo crocodile
                - Crocodylus novaeguineae New Guinea crocodile

=== Species list ===
- Subfamily Osteolaeminae
  - Genus Osteolaemus
    - Osteolaemus osborni, Osborn's dwarf crocodile
    - Osteolaemus tetraspis, dwarf crocodile (There has been controversy as to whether or not this is actually two species; recent (2010) DNA analysis indicate three distinct species: O. tetraspis, O. osborni and a third, currently unnamed.)
  - Genus Mecistops
    - Mecistops cataphractus, West African slender-snouted crocodile
    - Mecistops leptorhynchus, Central African slender-snouted crocodile
  - Genus Brochuchus†
    - Brochuchus pigotti† (formerly Crocodylus pigotti)
    - Brochuchus parvidens†
  - Genus Euthecodon†
    - Euthecodon nitriae†
    - Euthecodon brumpti†
    - Euthecodon arambourgi†
  - Genus Rimasuchus†
    - Rimasuchus lloydi† (formerly Crocodylus lloydi)
