= Crocodylus palaeindicus =

Crocodylus palaeindicus Temporal range: Late Miocene–Early Middle Pleistocene, 11.6–0.73 Ma

Scientific classification
- Kingdom: Animalia
- Phylum: Chordata
- Class: Reptilia
- Order: Crocodylia
- Family: Crocodylidae
- Genus: Crocodylus
- Species: †C. palaeindicus

Binomial name
- †Crocodylus palaeindicus Falconer, 1859

Synonyms
- Crocodylus sivalensis Lydekker, 1886

Extinct species of reptile

Crocodylus palaeindicus is an extinct species of crocodile from southern Asia. C. palaeindicus lived from the Miocene to the Pleistocene epoch. It may be an ancestor of the living Mugger crocodile.

== History ==
C. palaeindicus was first named by Scottish paleontologist Hugh Falconer in 1859. Falconer found fossils of the species in the Piram Island of western India along with the remains of many other Late Miocene animals like Bramatherium, Deinotherium indicum and Brachypotherium. Richard Lydekker later named another crocodile from the Sivalik Hills of northern Indiawhich he called C. sivalensis, based on the skull collected by Proby Cautley during Doab irrigation construction in Yamuna region, Mook in 1933 also reported a nearly complete skull of Crocodylus sivalensis present at Barnum Brown collection, which he collected 15 miles east of Chandigarh, India. Although the two crocodiles are very similar, C. sivalensis was distinguished from C. palaeindicus because the margin of its skull was less convex. C. sivalensis has recently been synonymized with C. palaeindicus, as the slight differences in shape are thought to be from natural variation or from fossilization. In later years, fossils were also found from Upper Irrawadey Formation of Myanmar and Chinji Formation of Lower Siwaliks Potwar plateau, Pakistan, though due to lack of clear autapomorphies of these specimens, they are considered as cf. Crocodylus palaeindicus.

== Classification ==
Historically, C. palaeindicus was considered a direct ancestor of the Mugger crocodile C. palustris. The two species are similar in appearance, and some fossils of C. palaeindicus were at first mistaken for C. palustris. Most modern phylogenetic analyses of crocodiles place C. palaeindicus in a basal position among members of the genus Crocodylus. Below is a cladogram modified from Brochu et al. (2010) showing the relation of C. palaeindicus with other crocodiles:

- Crocodylidae
  - Tomistominae
  - Crocodylinae
    - †Mekosuchinae
    - †"Crocodylus" megarhinus
    - - Osteolaeminae
      - - Mecistops cataphractus
        - - - Crocodylus niloticus
            - New World crocodiles
              - Crocodylus acutus
              - Crocodylus intermedius
              - Crocodylus rhombifer
              - Crocodylus moreletii
          - †Crocodylus anthropophagus
          - †Crocodylus palaeindicus
          - - Crocodylus palustris
            - Indopacific crocodiles
              - Crocodylus siamensis
              - - Crocodylus porosus
                - Crocodylus johnstoni
                - Crocodylus novaeguineae
                - Crocodylus mindorensis

A 2018 tip dating study by Lee & Yates simultaneously using morphological, molecular (DNA sequencing), and stratigraphic (fossil age) data established the inter-relationships within Crocodylidae. In 2021, Hekkala et al. were able to use paleogenomics, extracting DNA from the extinct Voay, to better establish the relationships within Crocodylidae, including the subfamilies Crocodylinae and Osteolaeminae.

The below cladogram shows the results of the latest study:

- Crocodylidae (crown group)
  - Osteolaeminae
    - - Mecistops cataphractus West African slender-snouted crocodile
      - Euthecodon†
    - - Brochuchus†
      - - Rimasuchus†
        - - Osteolaemus osborni Osborn's dwarf crocodile
          - Osteolaemus tetraspis Dwarf crocodile
  - Crocodylinae
    - Voay†
    - Crocodylus
      - - - Crocodylus anthropophagus†
          - Crocodylus thorbjarnarsoni†
        - - Crocodylus palaeindicus†
          - Crocodylus Tirari Desert†
      - - Asia+Australia
          - - Crocodylus johnstoni Freshwater crocodile
            - - Crocodylus novaeguineae New Guinea crocodile
              - Crocodylus mindorensis Philippine crocodile
          - - Crocodylus porosus Saltwater crocodile
            - - Crocodylus siamensis Siamese crocodile
              - Crocodylus palustris Mugger crocodile
        - Africa+New World
          - - Crocodylus checchiai†
            - Crocodylus falconensis†
          - - Crocodylus suchus West African crocodile
            - - Crocodylus niloticus Nile crocodile
              - New World
                - - Crocodylus moreletii Morelet's crocodile
                  - Crocodylus rhombifer Cuban crocodile
                - - Crocodylus intermedius Orinoco crocodile
                  - Crocodylus acutus American crocodile
