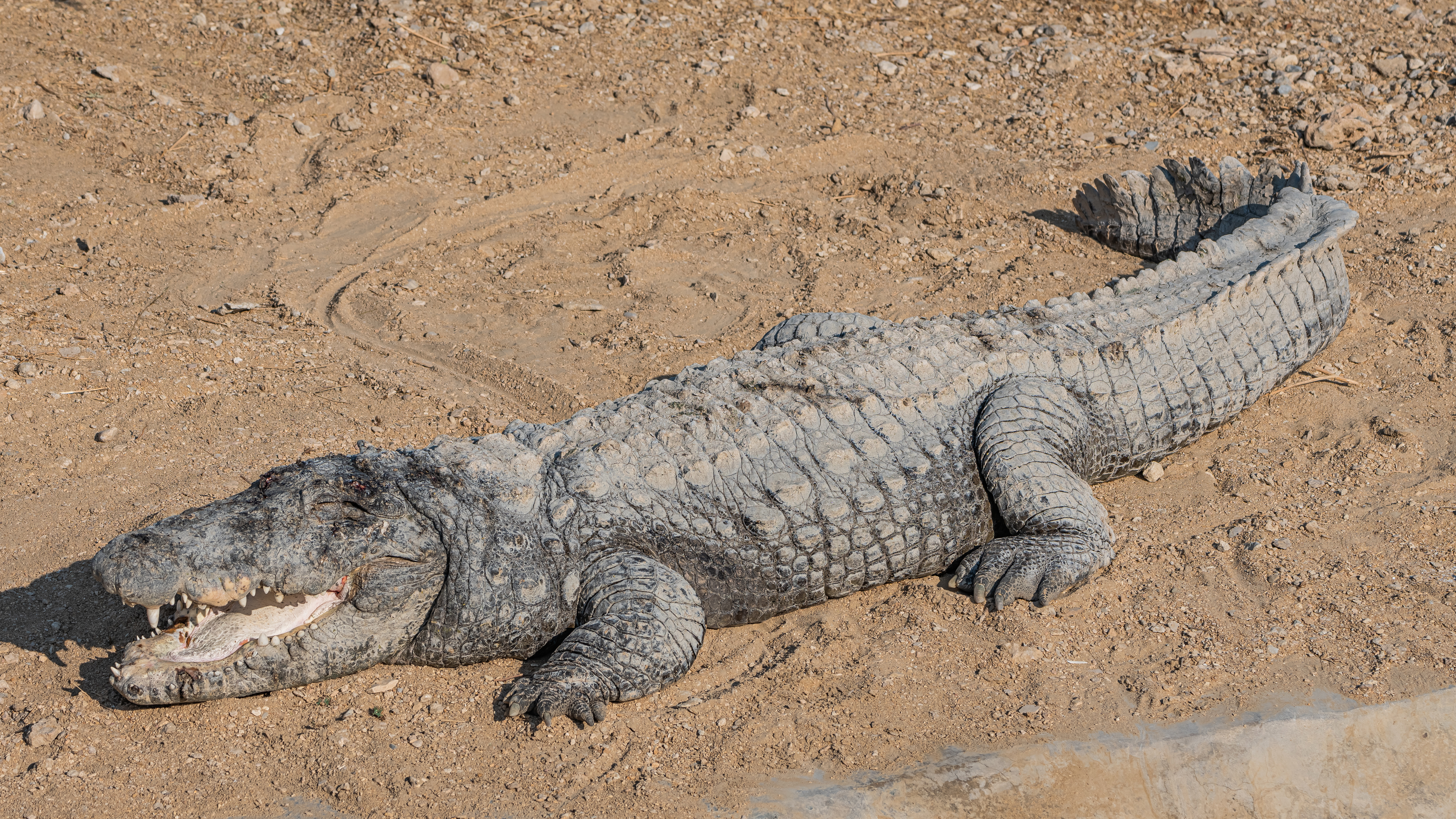
- Mugger crocodile (Crocodylus palustris)

Scientific classification
- Kingdom: Animalia
- Phylum: Chordata
- Class: Reptilia
- Clade: Archosauria
- Order: Crocodilia
- Superfamily: Crocodyloidea
- Family: Crocodylidae
- Subfamily: Crocodylinae; Cuvier, 1807

Type species
- Crocodylus niloticus Laurenti, 1768

Genera
- Crocodylus; Mecistops?; †Aldabrachampsus?; †Voay

= Crocodylinae =

Crocodylinae Temporal range: Eocene–Holocene, 38–0 Ma

Subfamily of crocodiles

Crocodylinae is a subfamily of true crocodiles within the family Crocodylidae, and is the sister taxon to Osteolaeminae (dwarf crocodiles and slender-snouted crocodiles).

== Taxonomy ==
Crocodylinae was cladistically defined by Christopher Brochu in 1999 as Crocodylus niloticus (the Nile crocodile) and all crocodylians more closely related to it than to Osteolaemus tetraspis (the Dwarf crocodile). This is a stem-based definition, and is the sister taxon to Osteolaeminae.

Crocodylinae contains the extant genus Crocodylus. It is disputed as to whether is also includes Mecistops (slender-snouted crocodiles), or the extinct genus Voay.

=== Phylogeny ===
Some morphological studies have recovered Mecistops as a basal member of Crocodylinae, more closely related to Crocodylus than to Osteolaemus and the other members of Osteolaeminae, as shown in the cladogram below.

- Crocodylidae
  - Osteolaeminae
    - Rimasuchus lloydi†
    - - Voay robustus†
      - - Osteolaemus osborni Osborn's dwarf crocodile
        - Osteolaemus tetraspis Dwarf crocodile
    - - "Crocodylus" gariepensis†
      - - - Brochuchus parvidens†
          - Brochuchus pigotti†
        - - Euthecodon arambourgi†
          - Euthecodon brumpti†
  - Crocodylinae
    - Mecistops cataphractus West African slender-snouted crocodile
    - - - Crocodylus thorbjarnarsoni†
        - Crocodylus anthropophagus†
      - - Crocodylus niloticus Nile crocodile
        - - Crocodylus checchiai†
          - Crocodylus moreletii Morelet's crocodile
          - Crocodylus intermedius Orinoco crocodile
          - Crocodylus acutus American crocodile
          - Crocodylus rhombifer Cuban crocodile
        - Crocodylus palaeindicus†
        - - Crocodylus palustris Mugger crocodile
          - - - Crocodylus ossifragus†
              - Crocodylus siamensis Siamese crocodile
            - - Crocodylus mindorensis Philippine crocodile
              - Crocodylus johnstoni Freshwater crocodile
              - Crocodylus porosus Saltwater crocodile
              - - Crocodylus raninus Borneo crocodile
                - Crocodylus novaeguineae New Guinea crocodile

The below cladogram is based on a 2021 study using paleogenomics that extracted DNA from the extinct Voay, recovering it as a member of Crocodylinae. Recently recognised species (M. leptorhynchus, C. halli and the third Osteolaemus species) placed according to 2023 study by Sales-Oliveira et al.

- Crocodylidae (crown group)
  - Osteolaeminae
    - - - Mecistops cataphractus West African slender-snouted crocodile
        - Mecistops leptorhynchus Central African slender-snouted crocodile
      - Euthecodon †
    - - Brochuchus †
      - - Rimasuchus †
        - - - Osteolaemus osborni Osborn's dwarf crocodile
          - - Osteolaemus tetraspis Dwarf crocodile
            - Osteolaemus sp. West
  - Crocodylinae
    - Voay
      Voay robustus †
    - Crocodylus
      - - - Crocodylus anthropophagus †
          - Crocodylus thorbjarnarsoni †
        - - Crocodylus palaeindicus †
          - Crocodylus Tirari Desert †
      - - - - - - Crocodylus johnstoni Freshwater crocodile
            - - - Crocodylus novaeguineae New Guinea crocodile
                - Crocodylus halli Hall's New Guinea crocodile
              - - Crocodylus mindorensis Philippine crocodile
          - - - - Crocodylus porosus Saltwater crocodile
            - - - Crocodylus siamensis Siamese crocodile
              - - Crocodylus palustris Mugger crocodile
        - - - Crocodylus checchiai †
            - Crocodylus falconensis †
          - - - - - - Crocodylus suchus West African crocodile
            - - - - - Crocodylus niloticus Nile crocodile
              - - - - Crocodylus rhombifer Cuban crocodile
                - - - Crocodylus intermedius Orinoco crocodile
                    - Crocodylus acutus American crocodile
                  - - Crocodylus moreletii Morelet's crocodile

=== Species list ===
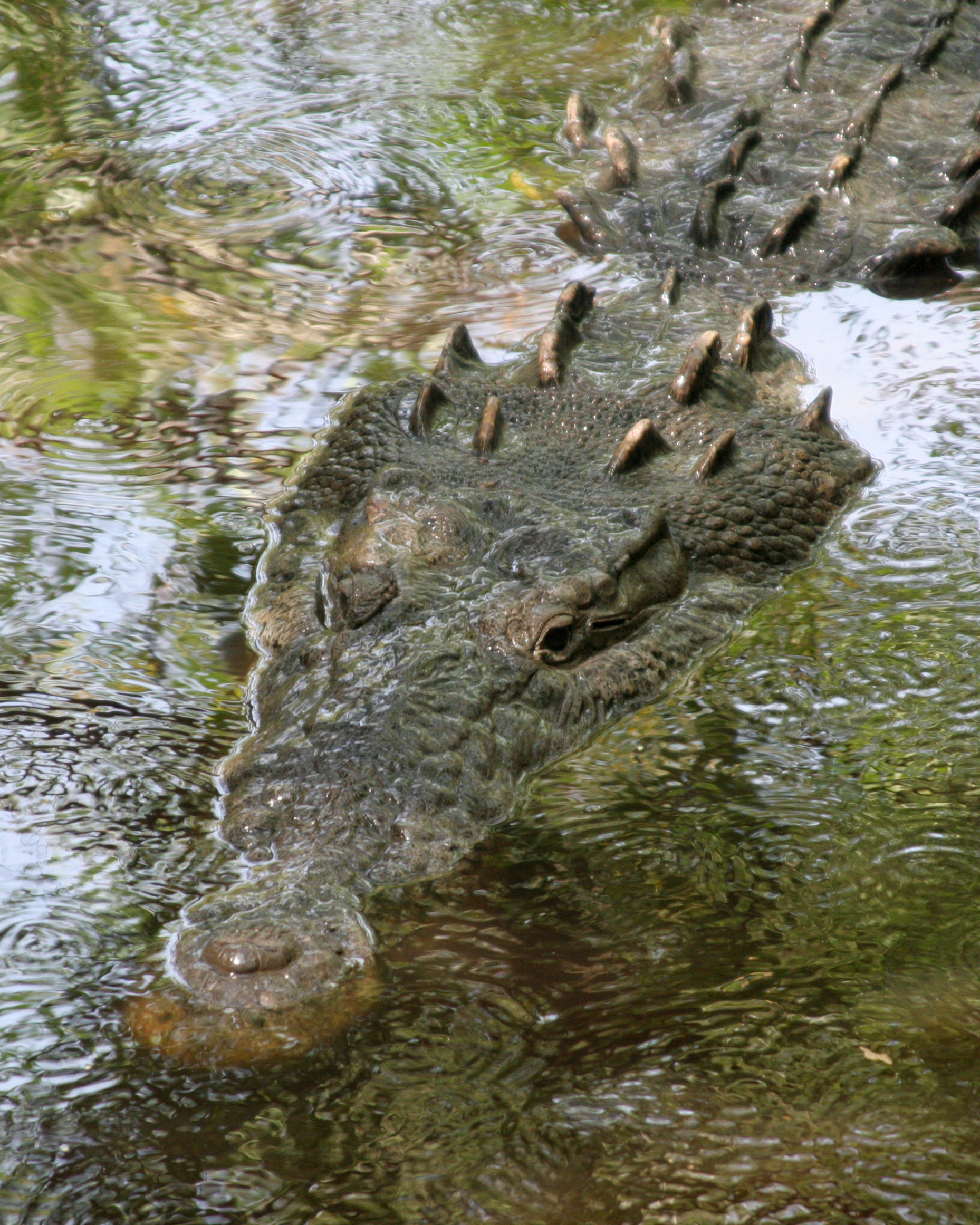
American crocodile at La Manzanilla, Jalisco, Mexico

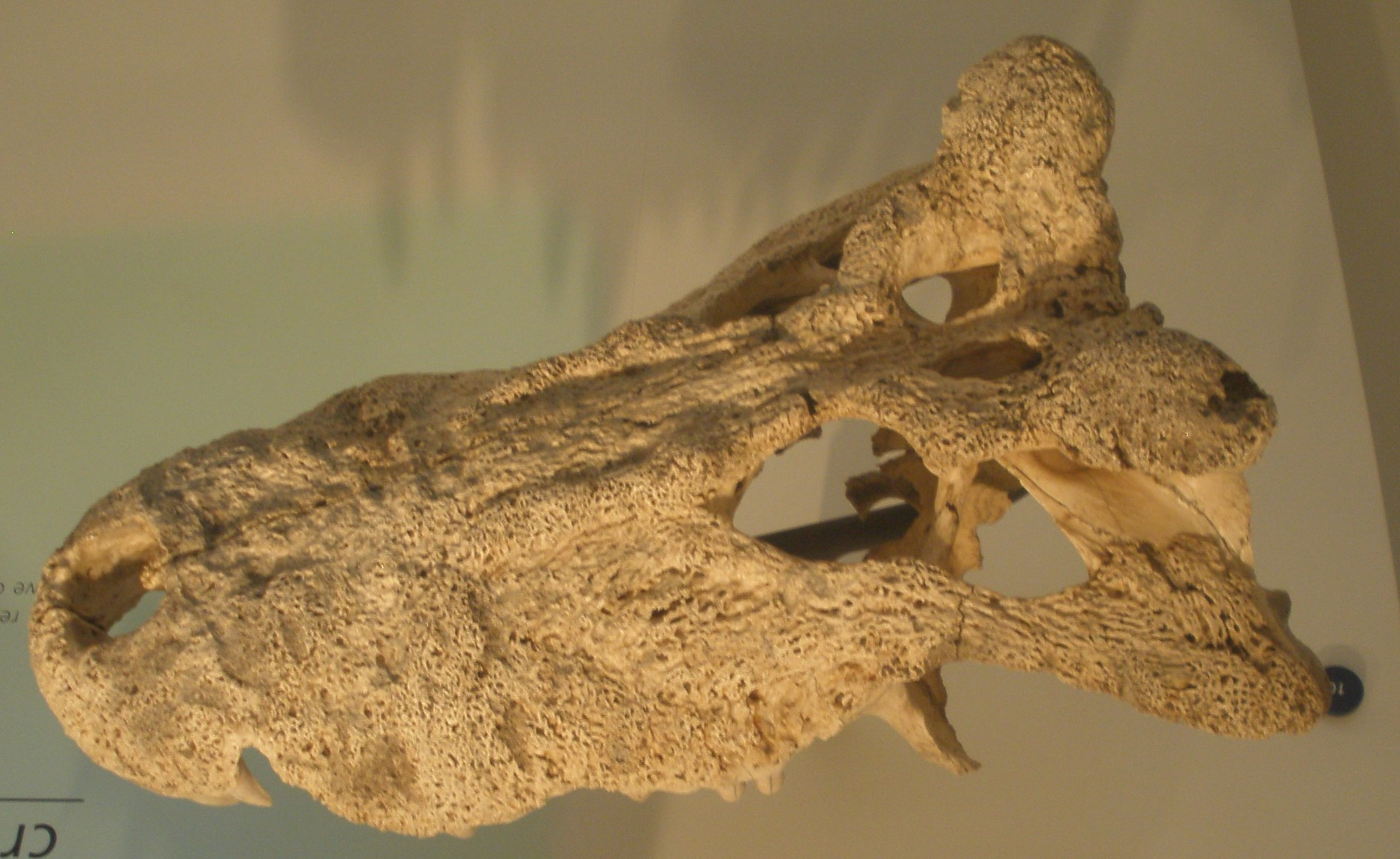
A skull of the extinct Voay robustus

Crocodylinae contains 13-14 extant species and 6 extinct species.

- Subfamily Crocodylinae
  - Genus Crocodylus
    - Crocodylus acutus, American crocodile
    - Crocodylus halli, Hall's New Guinea crocodile
    - Crocodylus intermedius, Orinoco crocodile
    - Crocodylus johnstoni, Freshwater crocodile, or Johnstone's crocodile
    - Crocodylus mindorensis, Philippine crocodile
    - Crocodylus moreletii, Morelet's crocodile or Mexican crocodile
    - Crocodylus niloticus, Nile crocodile
    - Crocodylus novaeguineae, New Guinea crocodile
      - Crocodylus raninus, Borneo crocodile, is related to C. novaeguineae, but whether or not it is a distinct species remains unclear.
    - Crocodylus palustris, mugger, marsh or Indian crocodile
    - Crocodylus porosus, Saltwater crocodile or Estuarine crocodile
    - Crocodylus rhombifer, Cuban crocodile
    - Crocodylus siamensis, Siamese crocodile
    - Crocodylus suchus, West African crocodile, desert or sacred crocodile
    - Crocodylus anthropophagus†
    - Crocodylus checchiai†
    - Crocodylus falconensis†
    - Crocodylus palaeindicus†
    - Crocodylus thorbjarnarsoni†
  - Genus Voay†
    - Voay robustus† (formerly Crocodylus robustus)
