= Rimasuchus =

Rimasuchus Temporal range: 23.03-16 Ma Early Miocene

Scientific classification
- Kingdom: Animalia
- Phylum: Chordata
- Class: Reptilia
- Order: Crocodylia
- Family: Crocodylidae
- Subfamily: Osteolaeminae
- Genus: †Rimasuchus; Storrs, 2003

Type species
- †Rimasuchus lloydi (Fourtau, 1918)

Synonyms
- Crocodylus lloydi Fourtau, 1918

Extinct genus of crocodilians

Rimasuchus is an extinct genus of large crocodile from the early Miocene of Egypt and possibly Libya. The genus contains a single species, Rimasuchus lloydi. It was previously thought to be a species of Crocodylus, but is now thought to be more closely related to the modern African dwarf crocodiles (Osteolaemus).

== History and naming ==
The first fossil of Rimasuchus an incomplete skull with associated mandible, was collected by lieutenant colonel Arthur H. Lloyd in the early 20th century in Wadi Moghara, Egypt. The holotype specimen, CGM 15597, was given to the Egyptian Geological Museum and described by Fourtau in 1918 under the name Crocodylus lloydi. Other material includes an uncatalogued skull housed at the Natural History Museum, London (likewise from Wadi Moghara) and fossils found at Gebel Zelten in Libya.

Eventually other skulls further south in Africa ended up being assigned to "Crocodylus" lloydi, with the oldest and southern-most material stemming from Namibia and the youngest fossils from Tanzania and Kenya in East Africa. This would have given the taxon a massive range both geographically and stratigraphically, spanning large parts of the continent from the Miocene up to the Pleistocene.

However revisions of these fossils soon reduced the range of "Crocodylus" lloydi back to its original state. In 2003 the Namibian material was named Crocodylus gariepensis by Martin Pickford, who suggested that it was the true ancestor of the Nile crocodile. Pickford found his argument strengthened when shortly prior to the release of the publication "C." lloydi was found to be a distinct genus, named Rimasuchus. In 2010 Christopher Brochu and colleagues named Crocodylus anthropophagus based on remains from Tanzania and two years later Crocodylus thorbjarnarsoni was named from Kenya. With the Kenyan specimens assigned to their own species, previous size estimates indicating that Rimasuchus grew to massive sizes and even preyed on humans were rendered out of date. Furthermore, with their description Rimasuchus was effectively removed from the fossil record of East Africa and the Pleistocene.

The generic name "Rimasuchus" comes from the Latin words rima, meaning "crack", which is referencing the East African rift valley. However the fact that later studies have shown the absence of Rimasuchus in the region renders the name somewhat ironic. The species name honors Arthur H. Lloyd, who initially discovered the fossils in Egypt.

== Description ==
Rimasuchus has a brevirostrine skull, meaning the snout is short and broad. The premaxillae are wider than long. The suture between the premaxillae and maxillae on the palate is relatively straight.

== Phylogeny ==
Early studies on Rimasuchus generally thought it to be a member of the genus Crocodylus within the Crocodylinae. Given its age it was believed for some time to have been the direct ancestor to the modern Nile crocodile. However most later studies came to agree that it was much more closely related to the Osteolaeminae, which includes both species of extant dwarf crocodiles. Given this placement, which was later supported by the animal being considered a distinct genus, the hypothesis that it was ancestral to Nile crocodiles has generally fallen out of favour. Pickford came to consider "Crocodylus" gariepensis the true ancestor of Nile crocodiles in 2003, however much like Rimasuchus it too was later recovered to likely fall within Osteolaeminae.

A 2018 tip dating study by Lee & Yates simultaneously using morphological, molecular (DNA sequencing), and stratigraphic (fossil age) data established the inter-relationships within Crocodylidae and in 2021, Hekkala et al. were able to use paleogenomics, extracting DNA from the extinct Voay, to better establish the relationships within Crocodylidae, including the subfamilies Crocodylinae and Osteolaeminae. Their results confirmed Rimasuchus' status as an osteolaemine. In their phylogenetic tree Rimasuchus was recovered as the closest relative to the two modern dwarf crocodile species and more derived than Brochuchus.

- Crocodylidae (crown group)
  - Osteolaeminae
    - - Mecistops cataphractus West African slender-snouted crocodile
      - Euthecodon†
    - - Brochuchus†
      - - Rimasuchus†
        - - Osteolaemus osborni Osborn's dwarf crocodile
          - Osteolaemus tetraspis Dwarf crocodile
  - Crocodylinae
    - Voay†
    - Crocodylus

Restricting the analysis to work based on morphological data alone also finds it to be an osteolaemine, although the internal relationships of the clade differ slightly. Here, it takes a more basal position, neither especially close to the extant forms nor to the long-snouted Euthecodon.

- Crocodylidae (crown group)
  - - Osteolaeminae
      - Rimasuchus lloydi†
      - - Voay robustus†
        - - Osteolaemus osborni Osborn's dwarf crocodile
          - Osteolaemus tetraspis dwarf crocodile
      - - "Crocodylus" gariepensis
        - - - Brochuchus parvidens†
            - Brochuchus pigotti†
          - - Euthecodon arambourgi†
            - Euthecodon brumpti†
    - Crocodylinae
      - Mecistops cataphractus West African slender-snouted crocodile
      - Crocodylus
