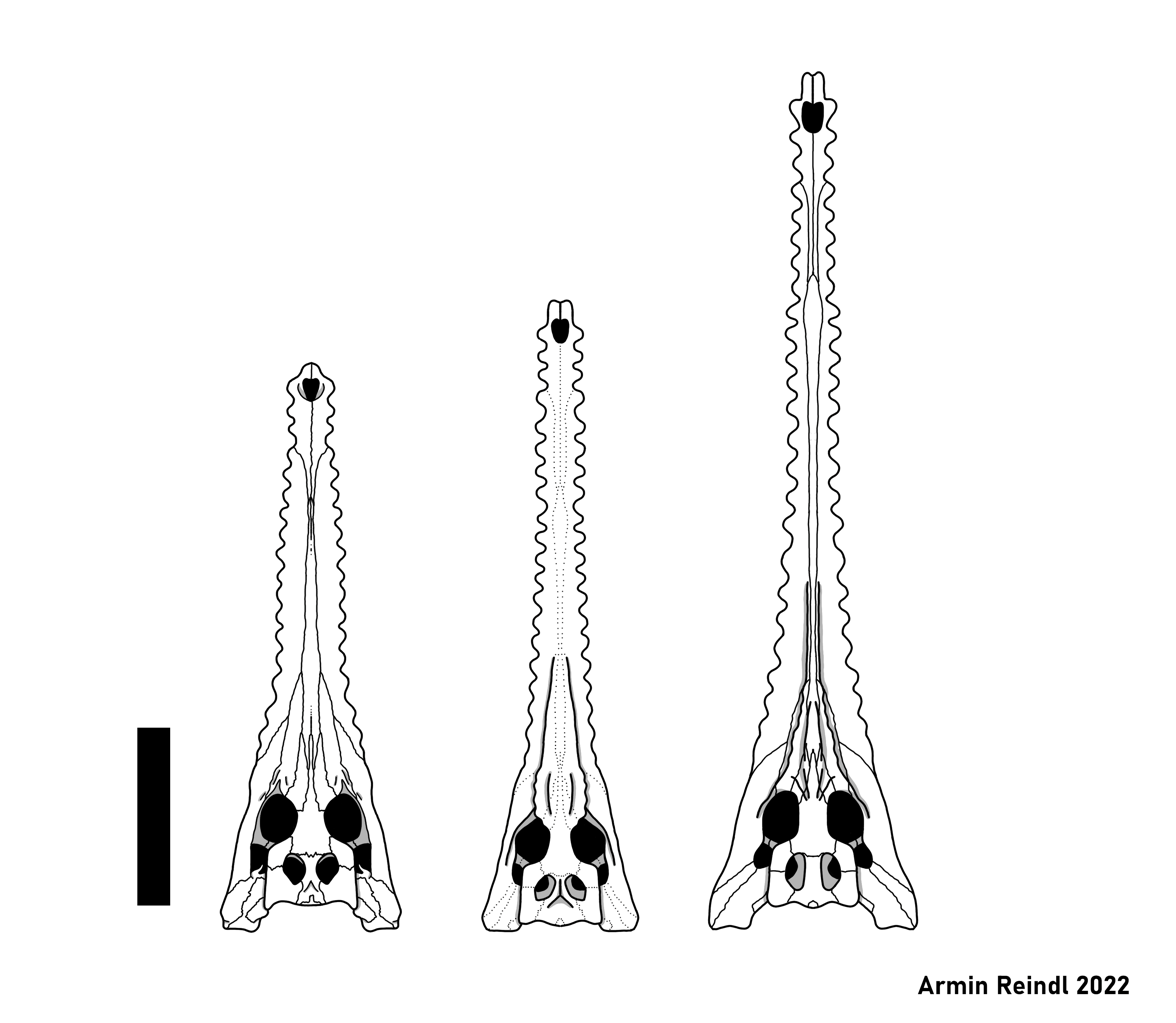
- From left to right: Euthecodon arambourgi, E. nitriae, E. brumpti

Scientific classification
- Kingdom: Animalia
- Phylum: Chordata
- Class: Reptilia
- Order: Crocodylia
- Family: Crocodylidae
- Subfamily: Osteolaeminae
- Genus: †Euthecodon; Fourtau, 1920

Type species
- †Euthecodon nitriae Fourtau, 1920

Species
- †Euthecodon nitriae Fourtau, 1920; †Euthecodon brumpti (Joleaud, 1920); †Euthecodon arambourgi Ginsburg and Buffetaut, 1978

= Euthecodon =

Euthecodon Temporal range: Miocene—Pleistocene, 23.03–0.781 Ma

Extinct genus of crocodilian

Euthecodon is an extinct genus of long-snouted crocodile. It was common throughout much of Africa during the Neogene, with fossils being especially common in Kenya, Ethiopia, and Libya. Although superficially resembling that of gharials, the long snout was a trait developed independently from that of other crocodilians and suggests a diet of primarily fish. Euthecodon coexisted with a wide range of other crocodiles in the areas it inhabited before eventually going extinct during the Pleistocene.

== Discovery and naming ==
The first remains of Euthecodon were described by French paleontologist Léonce Joleaud based on material collected by the Bourg de Bozas expedition between 1900 and 1903 in Ethiopia. These remains, thought to belong to a species of false gharial, were first described in 1920 under the name Tomistoma brumpti. Later that year René Fourtau described fossils from Wadi Natrun, Egypt as a new species and genus, Euthecodon nitriae. Subsequent researchers debated whether the two species were distinct enough to form separate species. Joleaud argued that the rostral proportions were too malleable to separate the two, later going as far as to propose that both specimens should still fall under the genus Tomistoma. Both Camille Arambourg and Josef A. Kälin recognized Euthecodon as a valid species but hesitated to split them into two forms, with Kälin recognizing only E. brumpti. Later both Antunes (1961) and Arambourg and Magnier (1961) came to support both species. The views of Oskar Kuhn and Rodney Steel are less clear, as their publications contain contradictions and taxonomic errors. A third species was described by Ginsburg and Buffetaut in 1978 based on a skull from Gebel Zelten, Libya, which was shorter proportioned than either of the two previously recognized forms. This species was named Euthecodon arambourgi after Camille Arambourg.

== Description ==
Euthecodon was a large-bodied crocodilian with an elongated snout similar to that of extant gavialoids. Euthecodon differs from any other known longirostrine crocodilian in its deeply scalloped rostral margins, each tooth sitting in its own bony sheath, separated from the next by a notable constriction of the rostrum, given the skull a saw-like appearance when viewed from above. The first mandibular teeth occlude outside of the premaxilla and never pierce it as seen in some other crocodilians. The individual teeth are slender, isodont and pointed with two keels (bicarinate), clearly suited for a piscivorous diet. Tooth count varies greatly between species. E. arambourgi, the species with the shortest snout, possesses 19 tooth sockets housing 20 teeth in the upper jaw. Ginsburg and Buffetaut assign 24 upper jaw teeth to E. nitriae and up to 27 for E. brumpti. The largest specimen from Lothagam possesses 21 teeth in the upper jaw and 20 in the lower, while some specimens from the Pliocene to Pleistocene of Kenya (Koobi Fora) preserve 24 to 25 maxillary teeth opposing 21 to 22 dentary teeth. This difference in tooth count has led some researchers to question whether these specimens, typically assigned to E. brumpti, might actually represent their own species. Unlike any other crocodilians, Euthecodon typically possess only four premaxillary teeth instead of five, with Euthecodon arambourgi as an exception, seemingly representing a transitional form in the process of losing the tooth. While still possessing five premaxillary teeth, the second is notably smaller than the rest and shares a single sheath with the third premaxillary tooth. The nasal bone bears a prominent ridge leading up to the eyes, giving its forehead a sloping appearance somewhat similar to that of Crocodylus checchiai. This form is maintained until the contact between maxilla and premaxilla, where the snout slightly slopes upwards and places the nares on a pedestal. Both the forehead boss and raised nares are most prominent in E. brumpti and far less developed in either E. nitriae or E. arambourgi. The nasals are always excluded from any contact to the nares by the premaxilla reaching far back in between the maxilla, meeting the nasal bone at the level of the sixth maxillary tooth. The nasal is fused in some specimens, while others retain it as two distinct bones with visible sutures. Both the prefrontal bones and lacrimal bones are long and splinter-shaped, with the lacrimals contacting the nasal bones towards the middle or anterior end of the "boss" depending on the specimen. Notably, the skull table of Euthecodon is comparably small and almost square in shape, with oval supratemporal fenestra (not circular as in gavialoids). Older individuals are known to develop noticeable squamosal ridges or "horns".

Some estimates suggest Euthecodon to be among the largest Cenozoic crocodilians, if not one of the largest Pseudosuchians, with one specimen (LT 26306), found in Lothagam in the Turkana Basin, being estimated to have reached a total body length of up to 10 m (33 ft). This specimen's skull alone would have measured 1.52 m (5 ft 0 in). Other specimens indicate smaller sizes however. In particular specimen KNM-ER 757 from the Koobi Fora Formation, a skull measuring 96 cm (38 in), was calculated to yield a length of 7.2–8.6 m (24–28 ft), accounting for a change in proportion in large sized crocodiles. Brochu and Storrs however note that this estimate was achieved by using the proportions of nile and saltwater crocodiles, which differ significantly in skull to body ration when compared to longirostrine taxa. Subsequently, these estimates may be exaggerating the actual size of Euthecodon in the absence of described postcranial remains.

== Species ==
- Euthecodon arambourgi

Described based on remains from the Miocene of Libya (Gebel Zelten) and Egypt (Moghara), E. arambourgi is attested by both sets of remains as having lived during the Burdigalian stage of the Miocene, making it the earliest recorded species of Euthecodon. Euthecodon arambourgi is distinguished from the other two species by its shorter and wider skull and the presence of five premaxillary teeth situated in four tooth sleeves.

- Euthecodon brumpti

Euthecodon brumpti was originally described based on fossil material collected in the Omo Basin of Villafranchian (Pliocene to Pleistocene), Ethiopia, with much material later found at other localities throughout East Africa. These localities include Lothagam (specifically the Nawata and Nachukui Formation), Kanapoi, Longarakak, Nakoret and Todenyang. However, according to a 2017 publication by Christopher Brochu, much of the Miocene to Pliocene remains found in the Turkana Basin may instead belong to an as yet unnamed species, although their anatomy roughly resembles that of E. brumpti. He also mentions the possibility that the species is a junior synonym of E. nitriae, an idea that has also been suggested by past researchers.

- Euthecodon nitriae

The type species of Euthecodon, its fossils were originally found at Wadi Natrun in Egypt (Miocene or Pliocene). Fossils tentatively referred to E. cf. nitriae have been found in the Upper Miocene (Tortonian) sediments of the Tunisian Ségui Formation.

Other remains of Euthecodon are known from the Miocene Beglia Formation (Tunisia), Early Miocene Rusinga Island (Lake Victoria), the Albertine Rift (Congo), Ombo (Kenya) and the Messinian to Zanclean Sahabi Formation (Libya). Despite this abundance in northern Africa around the Mediterranean, no fossils of Euthecodon have ever been found outside Africa.

Among the three recognized species, Ginsburg and Buffetaut note a clear evolutionary series from the oldest to youngest species. According to their research, Euthecodon shows a series of adaptations present in E. arambourgi and progressively exaggerated in E. nitriae, reaching their peak with E. brumpti. These adaptations include the gradual loss of the second premaxillary tooth, development of additional maxillary teeth, continued lengthening and narrowing of the skull, the exaggeration of a pre-orbital boss spanning the nasal, lacrimal, prefrontal and frontal bones, the raising of the external nares and the prominence of the lacrimal crest. The eyes also face more forward in later species than they do in E. arambourgi. The authors do, however, note that certain traits do not conform to such a direct evolutionary series, and instead appear most prominent in the intermediate E. nitriae. One such example is that in E. nitriae the prefrontals overflow the orbits, giving them a more circular appearance compared to that of E. brumpti. Ginsburg and Buffetaut suggests that this could be evidence for two possible hypothesis. The first holds on to a continuous lineage, suggesting that the continued rise of the nasal to frontal boss caused a complete reshaping of the region around the orbits, effectively undoing adaptations seen in earlier forms. Their second hypothesis proposes that Euthecodon split into two lineages, both evolving increasingly longirostral forms but doing so in different ways. This latter interpretation is favored by the fact that Euthecodon was clearly already present in East Africa by the early Miocene, as indicated by the remains from Ombo and Rusinga Island.

== Phylogeny ==
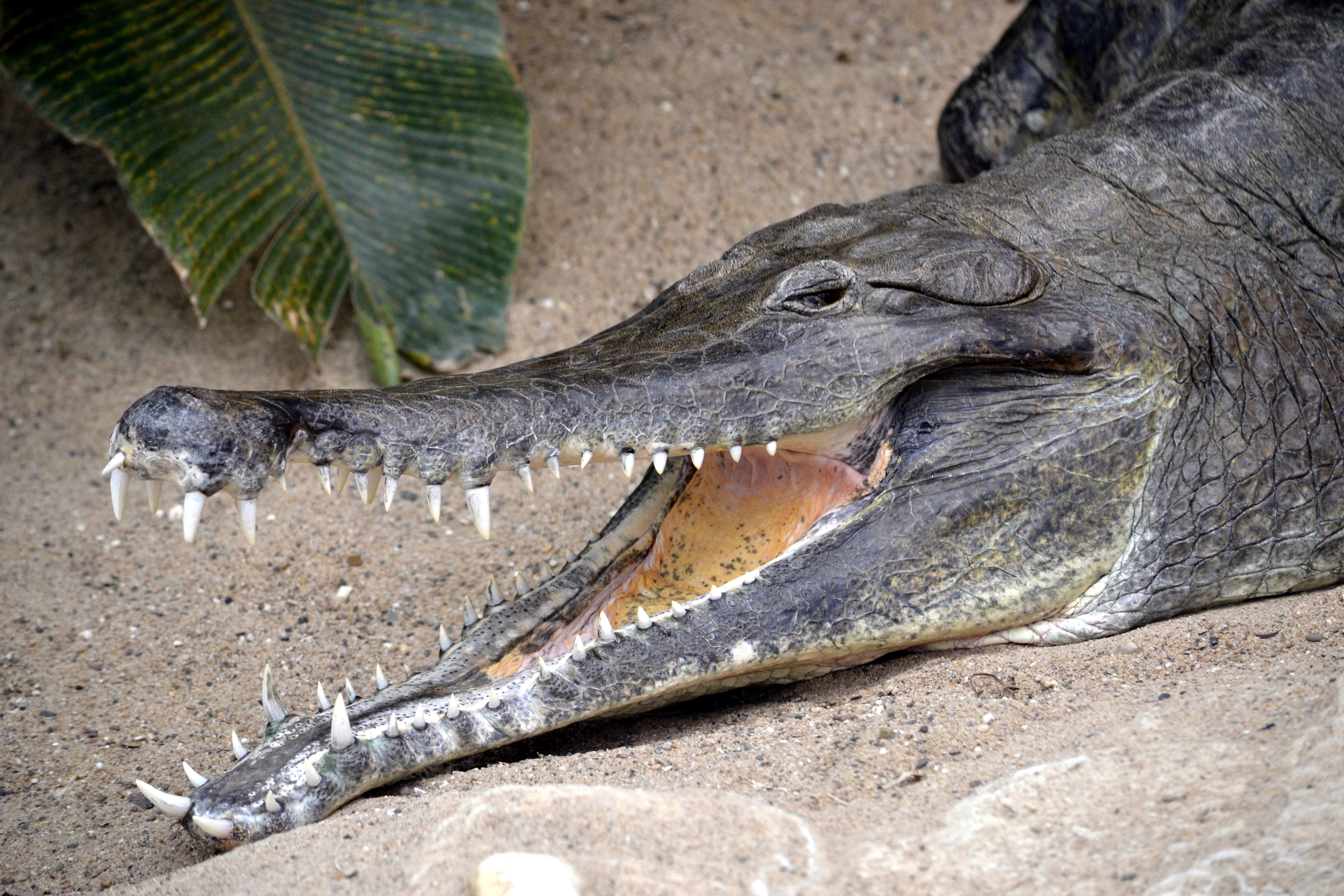
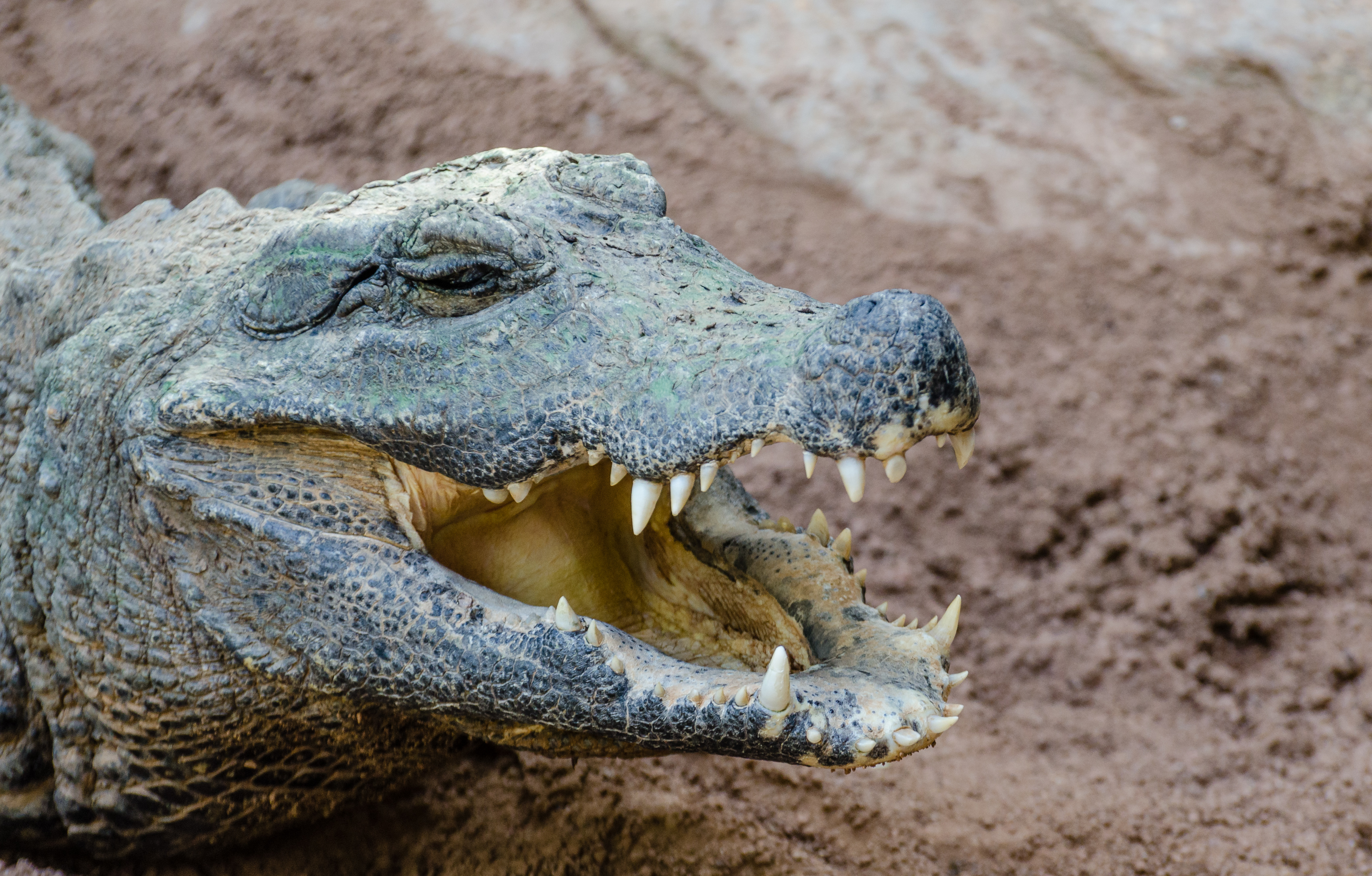
Mecistops and Osteolaemus, the two closest living relatives of Euthecodon

Although the genus was considered to be a tomistomine gavialoid or even a direct descendant of Eogavialis by early research due to its elongated skull, later research has repeatedly shown this to be merely be the result of convergent evolution, instead placing it much deeper within the Crocodylidae. For instance, Euthecodon differs from gavialids and most tomistomines in its small supratemporal fossae and the relatively gradual narrowing of the rostrum (something much more abrupt in gharials). Most current analyses place it in Osteolaeminae, a family consisting of the extant dwarf crocodile and the extinct Rimasuchus, Brochuchus as well as possible Voay and the slender-snouted crocodile. Phylogenetic analysis utilizing molecular (DNA sequencing), stratigraphic (fossil age) and morphological data recovers Osteolaeminae, as shown below, with Mecistops as a close relative of Euthecodon. Voay was recovered as closer to the genus Crocodylus.

- Crocodylidae (crown group)
  - Osteolaeminae
    - - Mecistops cataphractus West African slender-snouted crocodile
      - Euthecodon†
    - - Brochuchus†
      - - Rimasuchus†
        - - Osteolaemus osborni Osborn's dwarf crocodile
          - Osteolaemus tetraspis dwarf crocodile
  - Crocodylinae
    - Voay†
    - Crocodylus

Restricting the analysis to morphological data alone removes Mecistops from Osteolaeminae and brings Voay into the family. In this tree Euthecodon clusters with Brochuchus.

- Crocodylidae (crown group)
  - - Osteolaeminae
      - Rimasuchus lloydi†
      - - Voay robustus†
        - - Osteolaemus osborni Osborn's dwarf crocodile
          - Osteolaemus tetraspis dwarf crocodile
      - - "Crocodylus" gariepensis
        - - - Brochuchus parvidens†
            - Brochuchus pigotti†
          - - Euthecodon arambourgi†
            - Euthecodon brumpti†
    - Crocodylinae
      - Mecistops cataphractus West African slender-snouted crocodile
      - Crocodylus

== Paleoecology ==
Although Euthecodon superficially resembles gharials and likely inhabited a similar niche, its the functional morphology shows some clear differences. Throughout their evolutionary history, many Pseudosuchian groups that evolved elongated skulls (Thalattosuchia, Tethysuchia and many gavialoids) also show enlarged supratemporal fossae. Contrary to this connection between fossa size and snout length, however, Euthecodon has notably small supratemporal fossae, creating only a weak insertion point for the jaw musculature (adductor mandibulae externus profundus muscle). The unique alveolar sleeves likely evolved to at least partly compensate for this, allowing the bodies of the teeth to be much narrower than in other longirostrine taxa. Despite this, however, Euthecodon would have likely still had a relatively weak bite. The eyes also show clear convergence with gavialoids through different means. To elevate their eyes above the rostrum, derived gharials have increased the circumference of the orbits and enlarged orbital rims, while in Euthecodon similar results are achieved by raising the entire orbital region. The extremely elongated yet fragile rostrum, trap-like interlocking teeth and raised nares and orbits all indicate a piscivorous diet and aquatic lifestyle, perfected by the Pliocene to Pleistocene Euthecodon brumpti.

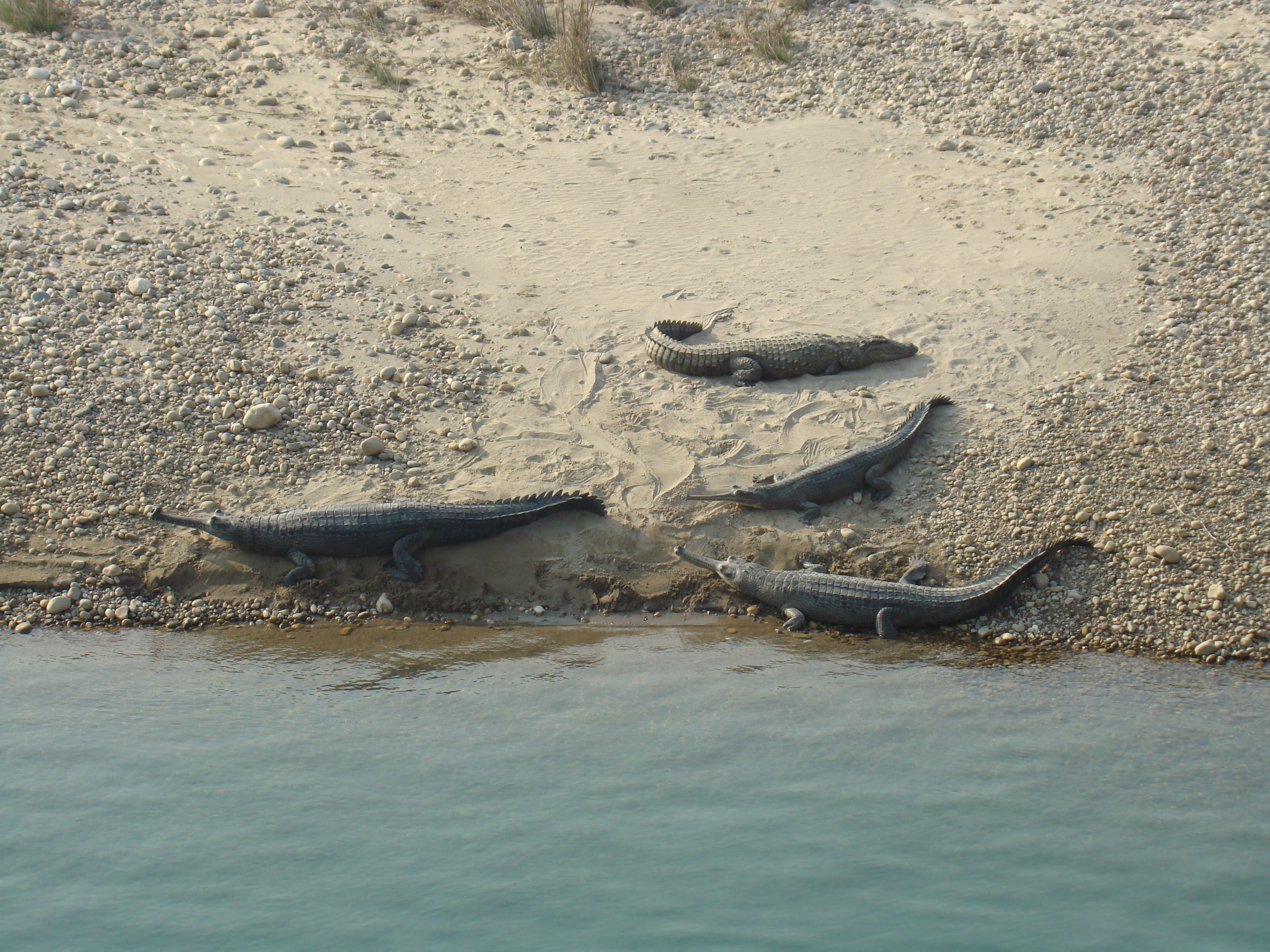
Modern gharials basking alongside the generalist Mugger crocodile

Euthecodon was just one of several species within the diverse Crocodilian fauna of Miocene to Pliocene Africa, mirroring similar conditions observed elsewhere during the Miocene (South Americas Pebas Megawetlands and Australia's Riversleigh). In Lothagam, in the southwestern part of the Turkana Basin, Euthecodon brumpti coexisted with as many as four different species of crocodiles, including the earliest records of Mecistops, the gharial Eogavialis and two species of Crocodylus: C. checchiai and C. thorbjarnarsoni. Of these, Euthecodon and Eogavialis are heavily specialised for a piscivorous diet, specialising in preying on smaller fish. Mecistops cataphractus, the modern slender-snouted crocodile, also shows a longirostrine snout morphology, but is more generalist, feeding on amphibians, crustaceans and birds in addition to fish. Such a high number of taxa all coexisting indicates a high degree of niche partitioning supported by favorable environmental conditions and a rich selection of prey items. Fish fossils from Lothagam indicate the presence of Nile perch, bichir, African lungfish and electric fish.

In northern Africa conditions appear similar, with Euthecodon arambourgi appearing alongside a cast of other crocodilians including the brevirostrine Rimasuchus and Crocodylus checchiai and the longirostrine Tomistoma lusitanicum in both Egypt and Libya. Both Moghara and Gebel Zelten preserve fluvio-marine environments yielding fossils of sharks, dolphins and sawfish alongside catfish, anthracotheres, carnivorans, proboscideans and primates. Gebel Zelten is especially well understood, the environment being reconstructed as rivers banked by tropical forests coming from the south and feeding into a large lagoon, while the intermediate areas are covered by savanna. Although some crocodilians of the area (Crocodylus, Tomistoma and possibly Gavialosuchus) have been found on both sides of the Mediterranean, Euthecodon seemingly never ventured outside of Africa. This may be connected to its specialised lifestyle, preventing it from venturing too far out into saltwater and restricting it to the riverbanks further up river. By the time of Euthecodon brumpti, crocodilian diversity had diminished in East Africa compared to that in the older Pliocene records. In Ethiopia Euthecodon appeared alongside only two other crocodiles, the modern Nile crocodile and the slender-snouted crocodile. Eventually, increased aridification, increased salinity and conditions favoring more temporary bodies of water may have all contributed to the disappearance of the highly specialised Euthecodon, incapable of sustaining itself or traveling over great enough distances to other bodies of water like the generalist Nile crocodile.
