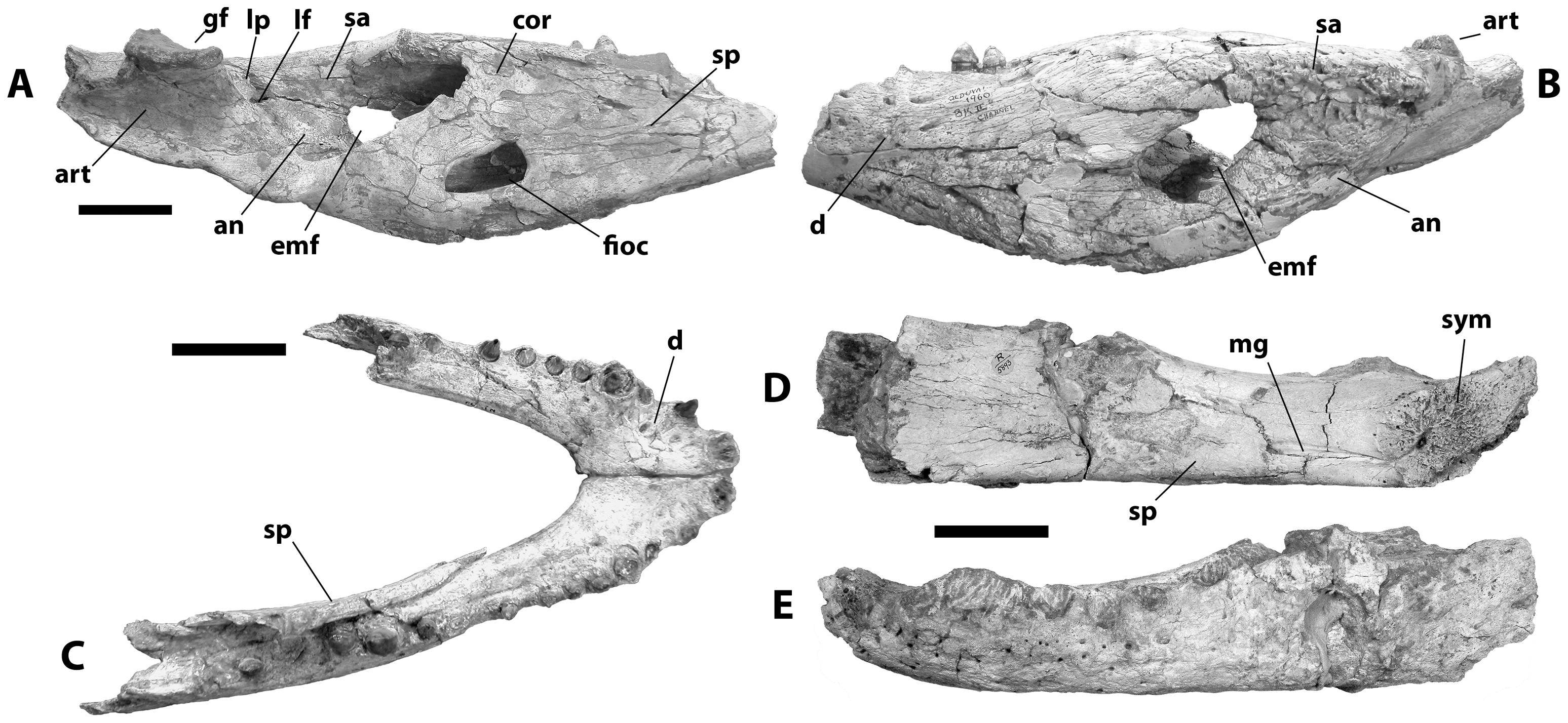
- Mandibular remains referred to the species

Scientific classification
- Kingdom: Animalia
- Phylum: Chordata
- Class: Reptilia
- Clade: Archosauria
- Order: Crocodilia
- Superfamily: Crocodyloidea
- Family: Crocodylidae
- Genus: Crocodylus
- Species: †C. anthropophagus

Binomial name
- †Crocodylus anthropophagus Brochu et al., 2010

= Crocodylus anthropophagus =

Crocodylus anthropophagus Temporal range: Pleistocene, 1.845–1.839 Ma

Extinct species of reptile

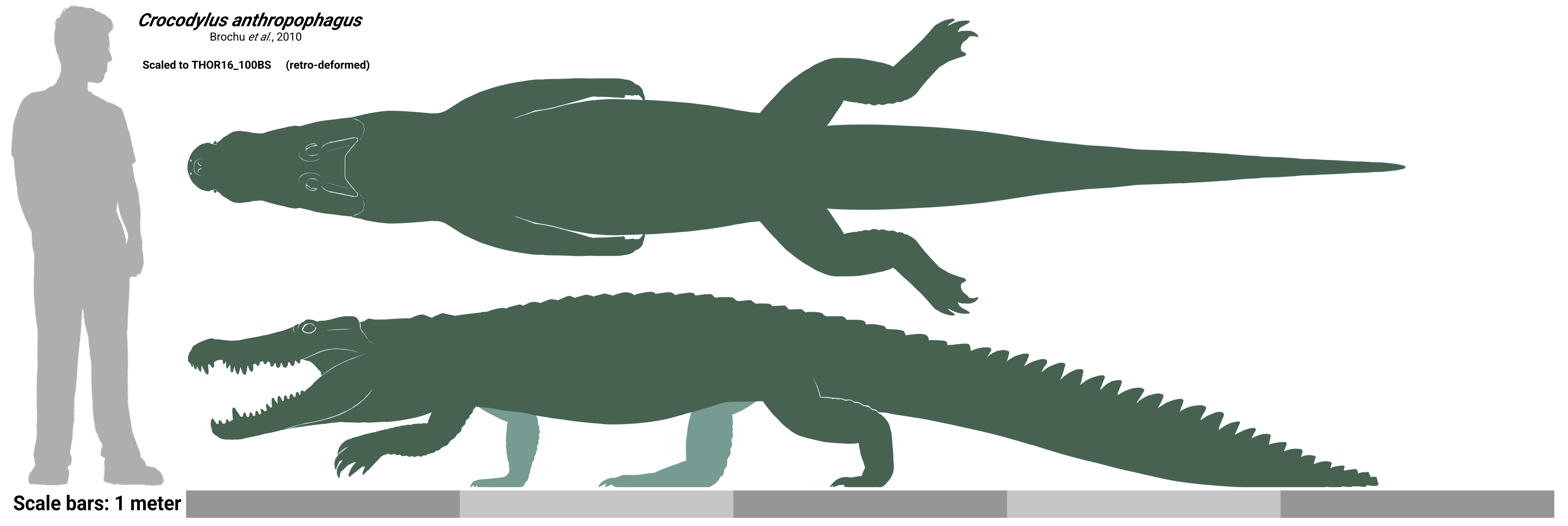
Size comparison

Crocodylus anthropophagus is an extinct species of crocodile from the Pleistocene of Tanzania. It lived 1.84 million years ago.

== Etymology ==
Crocodylus anthropophagus was first named by Christopher A. Brochu, Jackson Njau, Robert J. Blumenschine and Llewellyn D. Densmore in 2010. The specific name anthropophagus is from Greek word "anthropos" that means "human" and Greek word "phagos" that means "eater", in reference to the evidence that this animal included hominids in its diet.

== Taxonomy ==
The holotype specimen, NNHM-1001, comprises a skull and partial skeleton. All specimens were discovered in Olduvai Gorge, Tanzania, in two different rock formations dating to 1.845 and 1.839 million years ago in the Plio-Pleistocene. The cladogram below is from a 2021 study based on the finding of a new C. anthropophagus partial cranium.

- Crocodylinae
  - Mecistops cataphractus West African slender-snouted crocodile
  - - - Crocodylus thorbjarnarsoni†
      - Crocodylus anthropophagus†
    - - Crocodylus niloticus Nile crocodile
      - - Crocodylus checchiai†
        - Crocodylus moreletii Morelet's crocodile
        - Crocodylus intermedius Orinoco crocodile
        - Crocodylus acutus American crocodile
        - Crocodylus rhombifer Cuban crocodile
      - Crocodylus palaeindicus†
      - - Crocodylus palustris Mugger crocodile
        - - - Crocodylus ossifragus†
            - Crocodylus siamensis Siamese crocodile
          - - Crocodylus mindorensis Philippine crocodile
            - Crocodylus johnstoni Freshwater crocodile
            - Crocodylus porosus Saltwater crocodile
            - - Crocodylus raninus Borneo crocodile
              - Crocodylus novaeguineae New Guinea crocodile

== Description ==
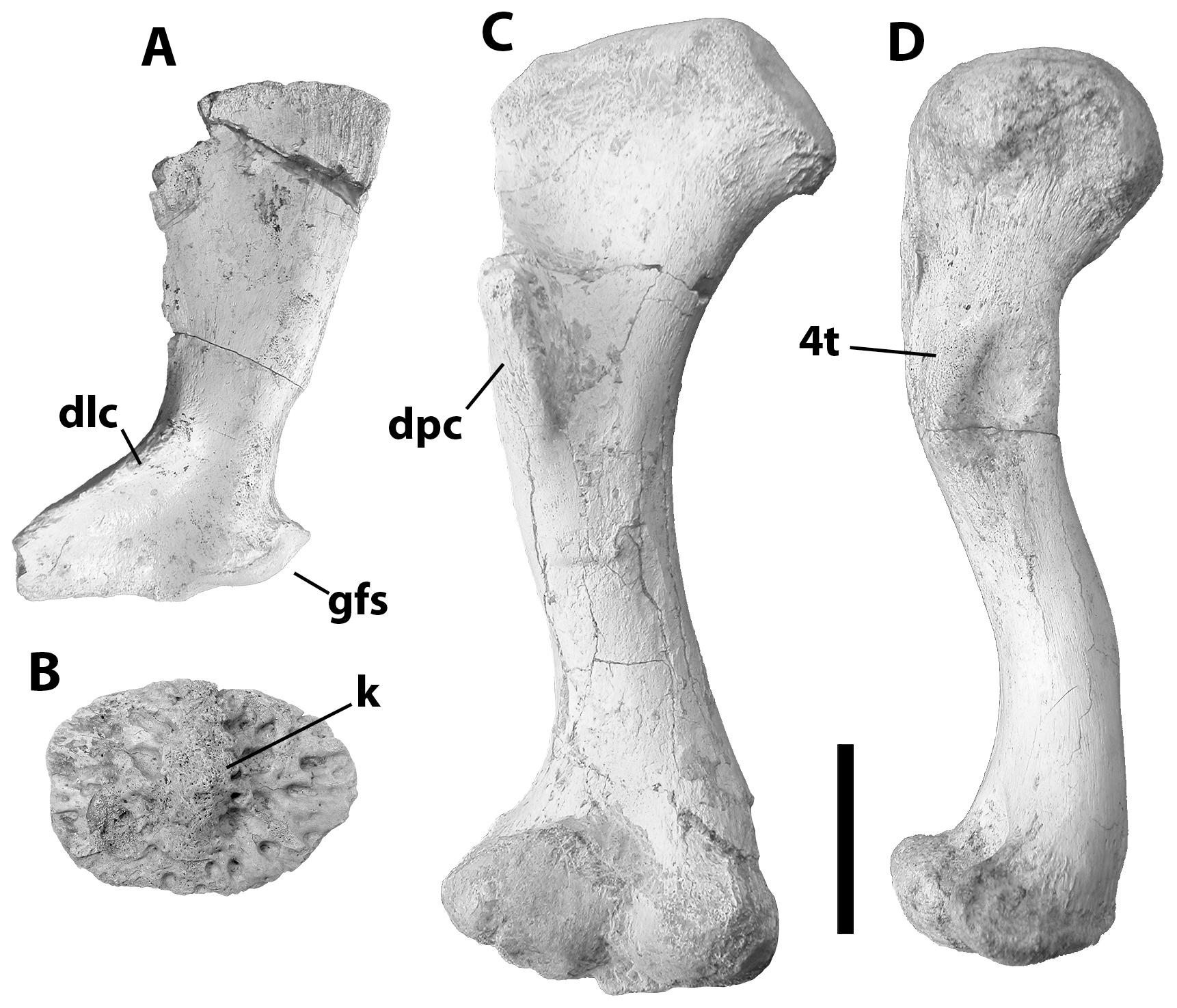
Postcranial material referred to Crocodylus anthropophagus

The skeleton is consistent with living representatives of the genus. The axis vertebra has a projection on the underside (a hypapophysis) which seems to have largely fused to the vertebra itself. The vertebrae are procoelous in shape, with a spherical projection extending from the back side which attaches to a concave socket on the front end of the preceding vertebra. The femora slightly bend in an S-shape. However, C. anthropophagus lacks the shallow bony pair of crests running from the eyes to the nose like in Indopacific Crocodylus, and lacks a boss (a lump of bone) on the middle of the snout like in Neotropical Crocodylus.

The right premaxilla (the bone that makes up the front end of the snout) of the holotype preserved three tooth sockets, with a notable gap in between the first and second sockets. Another specimen's left maxilla (the bone that makes up the back end of the snout) preserved 13 circular sockets, though it may have partially preserved a 14th. There was a gap between the 9th and 10th. The teeth were all conical and lacked serrations.

It had two prominent, triangular "horns" over the ears.

== Paleoecology ==
Crocodylus anthropophagus was the largest predator encountered by human ancestors at Olduvai Gorge, as indicated by hominin specimens preserving crocodile bite marks from these sites. Its type locality is near those for Homo habilis and Paranthropus boisei.
