= Brochuchus =

Brochuchus Temporal range: Early Miocene, 20.4–16 Ma

Scientific classification
- Kingdom: Animalia
- Phylum: Chordata
- Class: Reptilia
- Clade: Archosauria
- Order: Crocodilia
- Superfamily: Crocodyloidea
- Family: Crocodylidae
- Subfamily: Osteolaeminae
- Genus: †Brochuchus; Conrad et al., 2013

Type species
- †Brochuchus pigotti (Tchernov & Van Couvering, 1978 [originally Crocodylus pigotti])

Other species
- †B. parvidens Cossette et al., 2020

Extinct genus of reptiles

Brochuchus is an extinct genus of crocodile known from the Early Miocene Hiwegi Formation of Rusinga Island in Lake Victoria, Kenya; it was originally named as a species of Crocodylus. It contains two species, B. parvidens and B. pigotti. Brochuchus belongs to the family Crocodylidae, which includes all living crocodiles. The closest living relative of Brochuchus is Osteolaemus, the dwarf crocodile. Compared to Osteolaemus, which has a small body and blunt snout, Brochuchus has a more generalized crocodylid anatomy. Brochuchus is characterized by a flat and relatively narrow skull, and although it is larger than Osteolaemus it is smaller than most other crocodylids. It has two prominent bumps on the surface of its snout.

The genus was named in honor of Christopher A. Brochu, for his scientific work on Crocodylia and its relatives. The unusual combination and spelling are intended as an auditory and visual pun such that the 'ch' sound in Brochu takes the place of the 's' sound in 'suchus', which stems from the word 'souchos' (Greek for crocodile), a common suffix for crocodylomorph genera.

== Phylogeny ==
A phylogenetic analysis published in 2013 found that Brochuchus was a close relative of Osteolaemus. Brochuchus and Osteolaemus are part of a clade within Crocodylidae called Osteolaeminae. This clade is the sister taxon to Crocodylinae which contains the genus Crocodylus, which includes most living crocodiles.

== Paleobiology ==
Brochuchus has a generalized crocodylid body form with a long, narrow snout and a robust skeleton. Like most other species within Crocodylidae, Brochuchus was probably predatory and likely spent much of its time in water. As shown by the many mammal fossils that have been found on Rusinga Island, Brochuchus lived alongside several species of proboscideans (elephant relatives) and primates, the most famous of which is the early ape Proconsul. Although there is no direct evidence for what Brochuchus ate, it may have preyed on Proconsul. If this is the case, Brochuchus may have been one of the earliest anthropoidophagous ("ape-eating") crocodilians.
