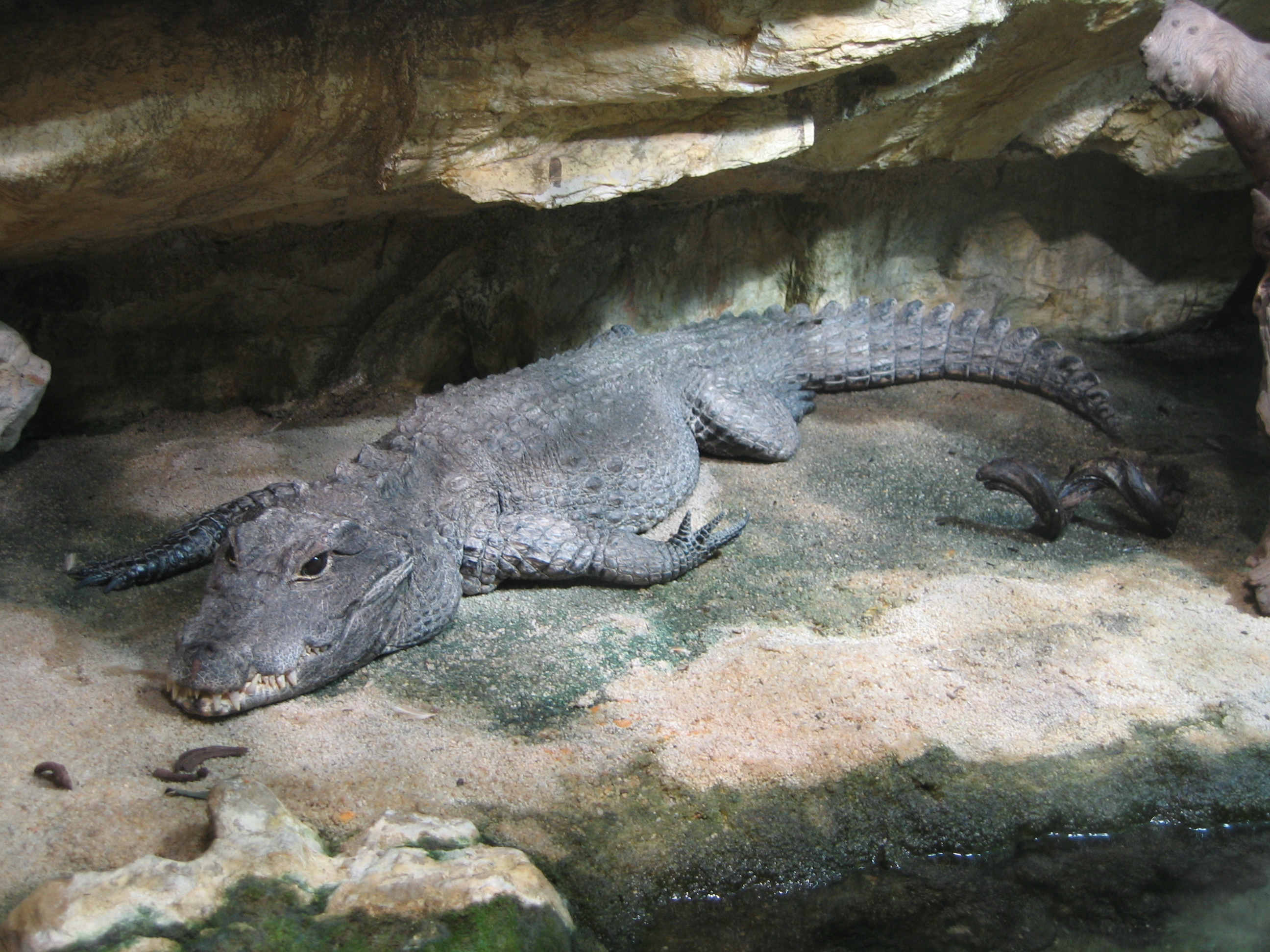
- A dwarf crocodile, Osteolaemus tetraspis, in a Paris aquarium

Scientific classification
- Kingdom: Animalia
- Phylum: Chordata
- Class: Reptilia
- Order: Crocodylia
- Family: Crocodylidae
- Subfamily: Osteolaeminae
- Genus: Osteolaemus; Cope, 1861

Type species
- Osteolaemus tetraspis Cope, 1861

Species
- Osteolaemus osborni; Osteolaemus tetraspis

= Osteolaemus =

Genus of crocodiles

Osteolaemus (from Ancient Greek όστεον (ósteon), meaning "bone", and λαιμός (laimós), meaning "throat") is a genus of crocodiles. They are small, secretive crocodiles that occur in wetlands of West and Middle Africa. They are commonly known as the African dwarf crocodiles. Unlike other crocodiles, Osteolaemus are strictly nocturnal.

== Species ==
The following species are recognized as being valid.

Genus Osteolaemus – Cope, 1861 – two species
Common name	Scientific name and subspecies	Range	Size and ecology	IUCN status and estimated population
Congo dwarf crocodile, Osborn's dwarf crocodile	Osteolaemus osborni (Schmidt, 1919)	Congo River basin of Central Africa	Size: Habitat: Diet:	
dwarf crocodile, African dwarf crocodile, broad-snouted crocodile, bony crocodile	Osteolaemus tetraspis Cope, 1861	West Africa and Ogooué River basin of Central Africa	Size: Habitat: Diet:	VU

Nota bene: A binomial authority in parentheses indicates that the species was originally described in a genus other than Osteolaemus.

Molecular data suggest that Osteolaemus tetraspis consists of two lineages that would warrant recognition as distinct species.
