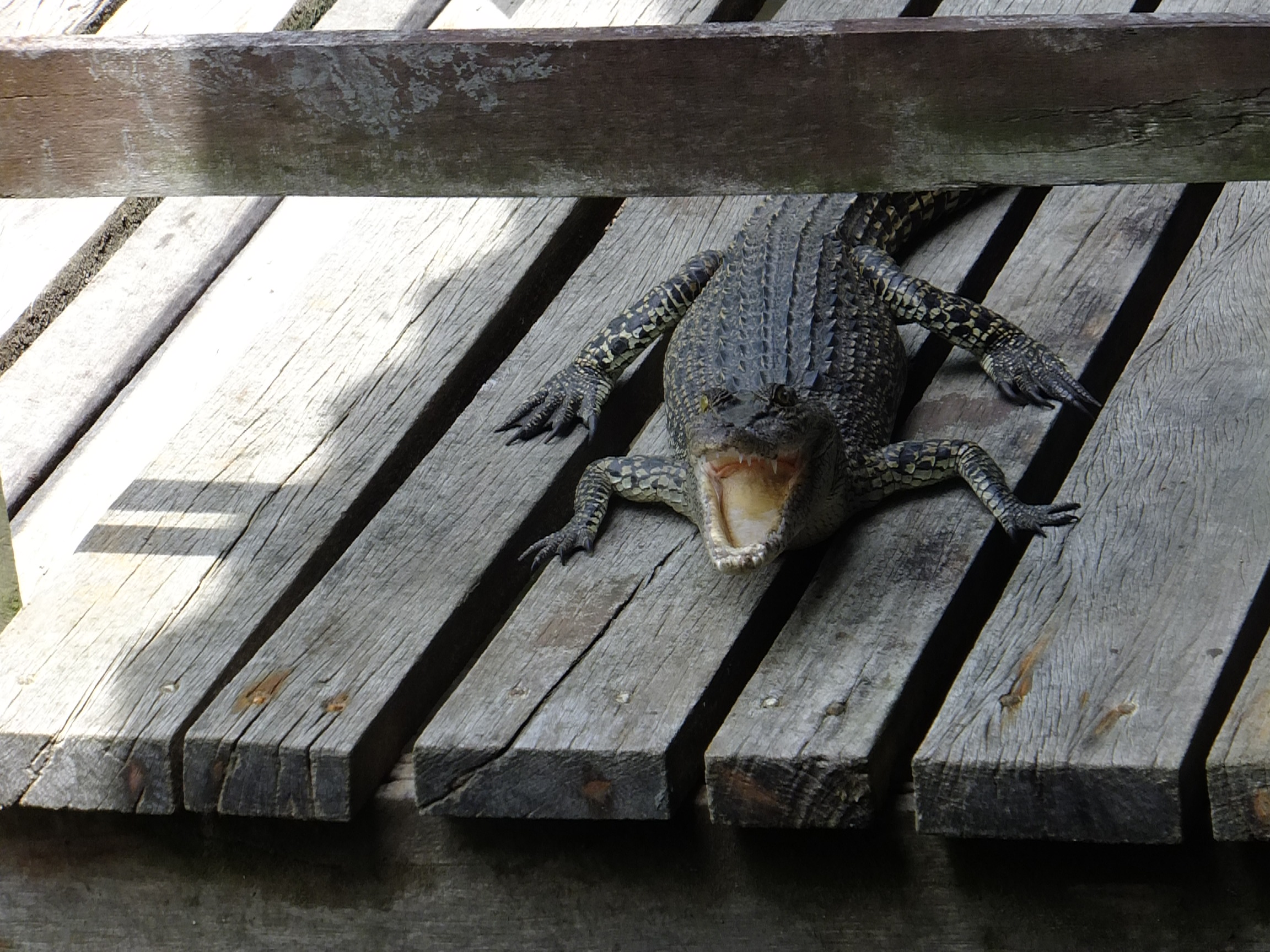
- Juvenile Specimen on a board walk

Conservation status
- CITES Appendix II

Scientific classification
- Kingdom: Animalia
- Phylum: Chordata
- Class: Reptilia
- Order: Crocodylia
- Family: Crocodylidae
- Genus: Crocodylus
- Species: C. raninus

Binomial name
- Crocodylus raninus S. Müller & Schlegel, 1844

Synonyms
- Crocodilus biporcatus raninus S. Müller & Schlegel, 1844; Crocodylus raninus Ross, 1990

= Crocodylus raninus =

Species of reptile

Crocodylus raninus, the Borneo crocodile, is an enigmatic species of freshwater crocodile endemic to the island of Borneo. Its taxonomic status is controversial and unclear: it has been considered by some authors as a synonym of Crocodylus porosus, although a redescription in 1990 and 1992 presented evidence of distinct identity. Based on external morphology and its skull C. raninus is most similar to C. novaeguineae.
