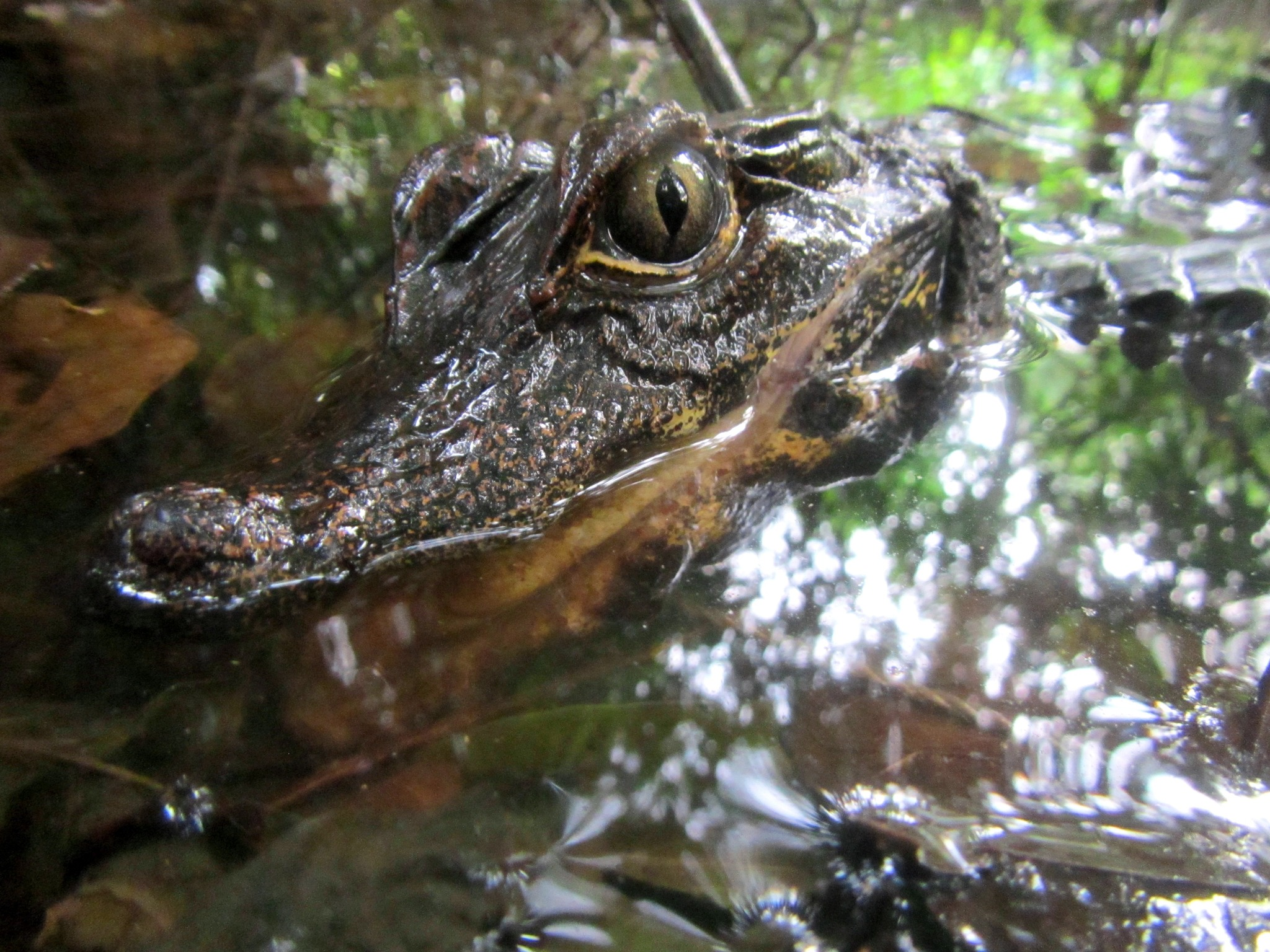

Conservation status
- CITES Appendix I

Scientific classification
- Kingdom: Animalia
- Phylum: Chordata
- Class: Reptilia
- Order: Crocodylia
- Family: Crocodylidae
- Genus: Osteolaemus
- Species: O. osborni

Binomial name
- Osteolaemus osborni (Schmidt, 1919)

Synonyms
- Osteoblepharon osborni Schmidt, 1919; Osteolaemus tetraspis osborni (Schmidt, 1919)

= Osteolaemus osborni =

Species of reptile

Osteolaemus osborni, commonly known as Osborn's dwarf crocodile and the Congo dwarf crocodile, is a species of crocodile endemic to the Congo Basin in Africa.

== Taxonomy ==
The species Osteolaemus osborni has had a somewhat convoluted taxonomical history. It was first described as Osteoblepharon osborni by American herpetologist Karl P. Schmidt in 1919, based on a few specimens from the Upper Congo River Basin in what is now the Democratic Republic of Congo. However, American herpetologist Robert F. Inger in a 1948 paper found the specimens wanting of characteristics that would justify a generic separation from Osteolaemus and referred the specimens to Osteolaemus osborni. In 1953, it was reduced to subspecies rank by German herpetologist Heinz Wermuth, but was revalidated to full species status in 2021.

== Description ==
Osteolaemus osborni is both the smallest crocodile and the smallest crocodilian since it does not surpass 1.2 m (3.9 ft) in total length (tail included).

== Reproduction ==
Osteolaemus osborni is oviparous.

== Etymology ==
The generic name, Osteolaemus, means "bony throat", and is derived from Ancient Greek όστεον (ósteon), meaning "bone", and λαιμός (laimós), meaning "throat". The genus was named as such due to the osteoderms found among the scales in the neck and belly.

The specific epithet, osborni, is in honor of American paleontologist Henry Fairfield Osborn.
