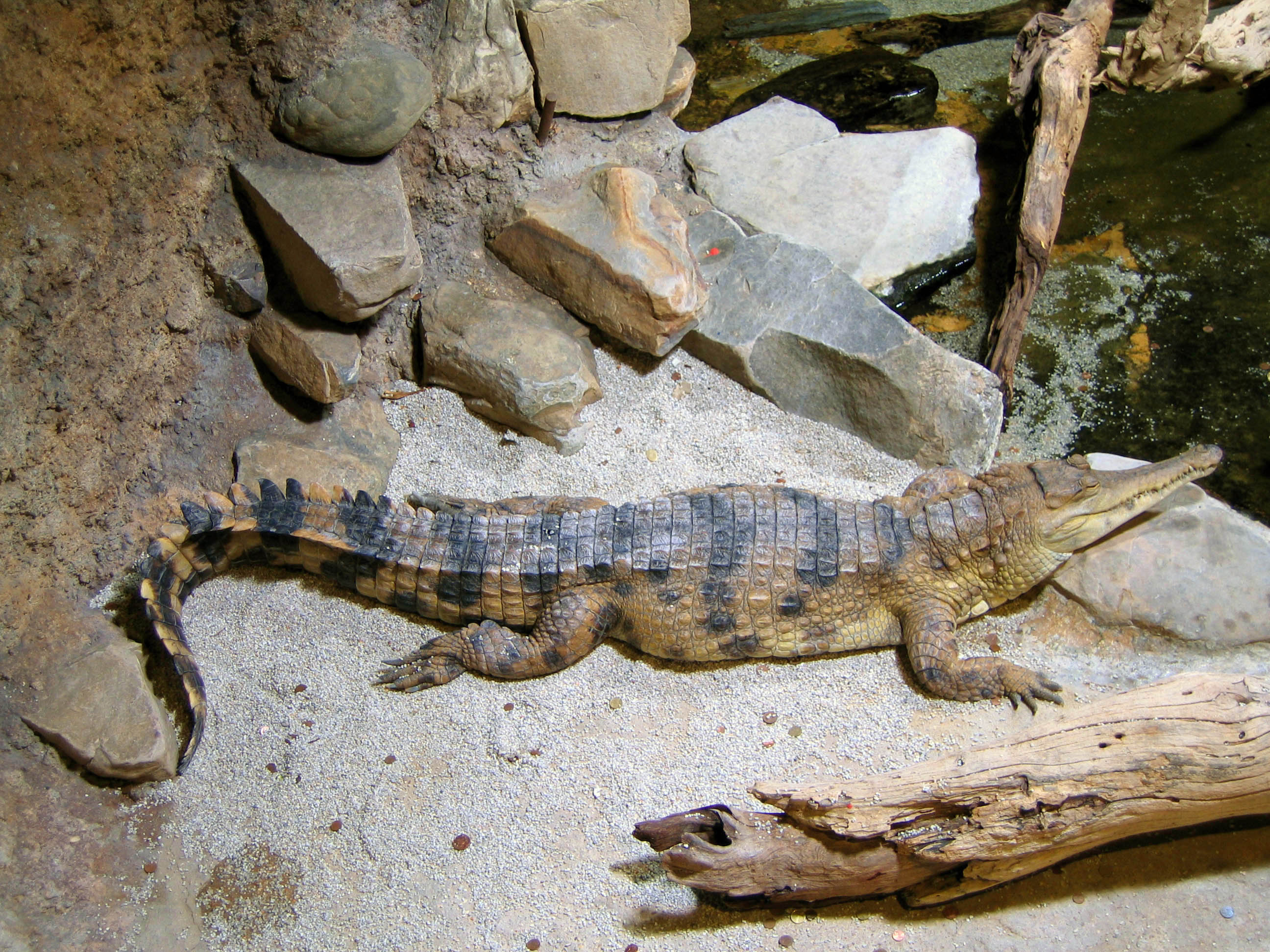
- West African slender-snouted crocodile at the porte dorée aquarium in Paris, France

Conservation status
- Critically Endangered (IUCN 3.1)
- CITES Appendix I

Scientific classification
- Kingdom: Animalia
- Phylum: Chordata
- Class: Reptilia
- Order: Crocodylia
- Family: Crocodylidae
- Genus: Mecistops
- Species: M. cataphractus

Binomial name
- Mecistops cataphractus (Cuvier, 1825)

Synonyms
- Crocodylus cataphractus Cuvier, 1825; Mecistops bennettii Gray, 1844

= West African slender-snouted crocodile =

West African slender-snouted crocodile Temporal range: Miocene – Recent, 11.6–0 Ma

Species of reptile

The West African slender-snouted crocodile (Mecistops cataphractus), or slender-snouted crocodile, is a critically endangered species of African crocodile. It is one of five species of crocodile in Africa, the other four being the Central African slender-snouted, Nile, West African and dwarf crocodiles.

The slender-snouted crocodile (M. cataphractus) was thought to be distributed across west Africa and into central Africa but the central African species has been separated as the Central African slender-snouted crocodile (M. leptorhynchus) based on studies in 2014 and 2018 that indicated that both were distinct species. The name cataphractus is retained for the West African species as that species was described first based on specimens from western Africa. The two species diverged about 6.5–7.5 mya, living in different river drainage zones that were geographically separated from each other by the Cameroon Line.

== Etymology ==
The genus name Mecistops is most probably derived from the Ancient Greek words μήκιστ (mēkist), meaning "longest", and ὄψ (óps) meaning "face". The specific epithet cataphractus is thought to be derived from the Greek word κατάφρακτος (katáphraktos) meaning "armoured" or "shielded".

== Description ==
As with its relative, the West African slender-snouted crocodile has a very long, slender snout that it uses to catch fish and small aquatic invertebrates. As with all crocodilians, larger animals may feed opportunistically on larger prey if it becomes available. They are relatively medium-sized, but large males can exceed several other species of crocodilians in size. Three individuals measuring 2.31 to 2.62 m (7 ft 7 in – 8 ft 7 in) and weighing 50–95 kg (110–209 lb) had a bite force in the range of 1,704–2,447 N (383–550 lb_{f}). Adult males typically reach 3 to 4 m (9 ft 10 in – 13 ft 1 in) in length. Large males can reportedly grow up to 4.5 m (15 ft) in length. They generally weigh between 125 and 325 kg (276 and 717 lb). The body mass of the largest males have been estimated to reach up to 667 kg (1,470 lb).

== Status ==
This species is relatively poorly known with few studies of the wild populations. Consequently, it was rated as Data Deficient by the IUCN in 1996. Following a review in 2014, it was moved to Critically Endangered, although this includes both the Central African and West African species. Their declining populations are attributed to the loss of their habitats, hunting, depletion of their prey, and illegal consumption of them through bush-meat markets. It appears to have been entirely extirpated from several countries where formerly present and declined elsewhere. Recent conservation efforts are in effect as project faux gavial works towards lessening the hunting and commerce of the slender-snouted crocodile. In its native range, it is extremely rare and on the verge of disappearing. There have been implemented protected wildlife preserves in Ghana, one of their main habitats, to help protect the species, though it has been largely ineffective. A study in 2015 that included 24 captive slender-snouted crocodiles in six US zoos (more than 50% of the slender-snouted crocodiles in AZA zoos) found that all were of West African origin, indicating that captive breeding may be important for conservation of this species. Captive breeding is currently being used by one zoo, the Abidjan zoo, who have already begun releasing captively bred individuals when they reach around 3–4 years old.

== Distribution ==
West African slender-snouted crocodile occurs widely in West Africa (Benin, Burkina Faso, southern Senegal, Gambia, Ghana, Guinea, Guinea-Bissau, Ivory Coast, Liberia, southern Mali, Nigeria, Sierra Leone, and Togo) and extends into Cameroon in Central Africa. They prefer to live in dense, vegetated bodies of water that are away from human settlements. Their distribution is currently being monitored by drone surveillance and prerecorded calls to attract them.
