= TV Puls =

Television station in Poland

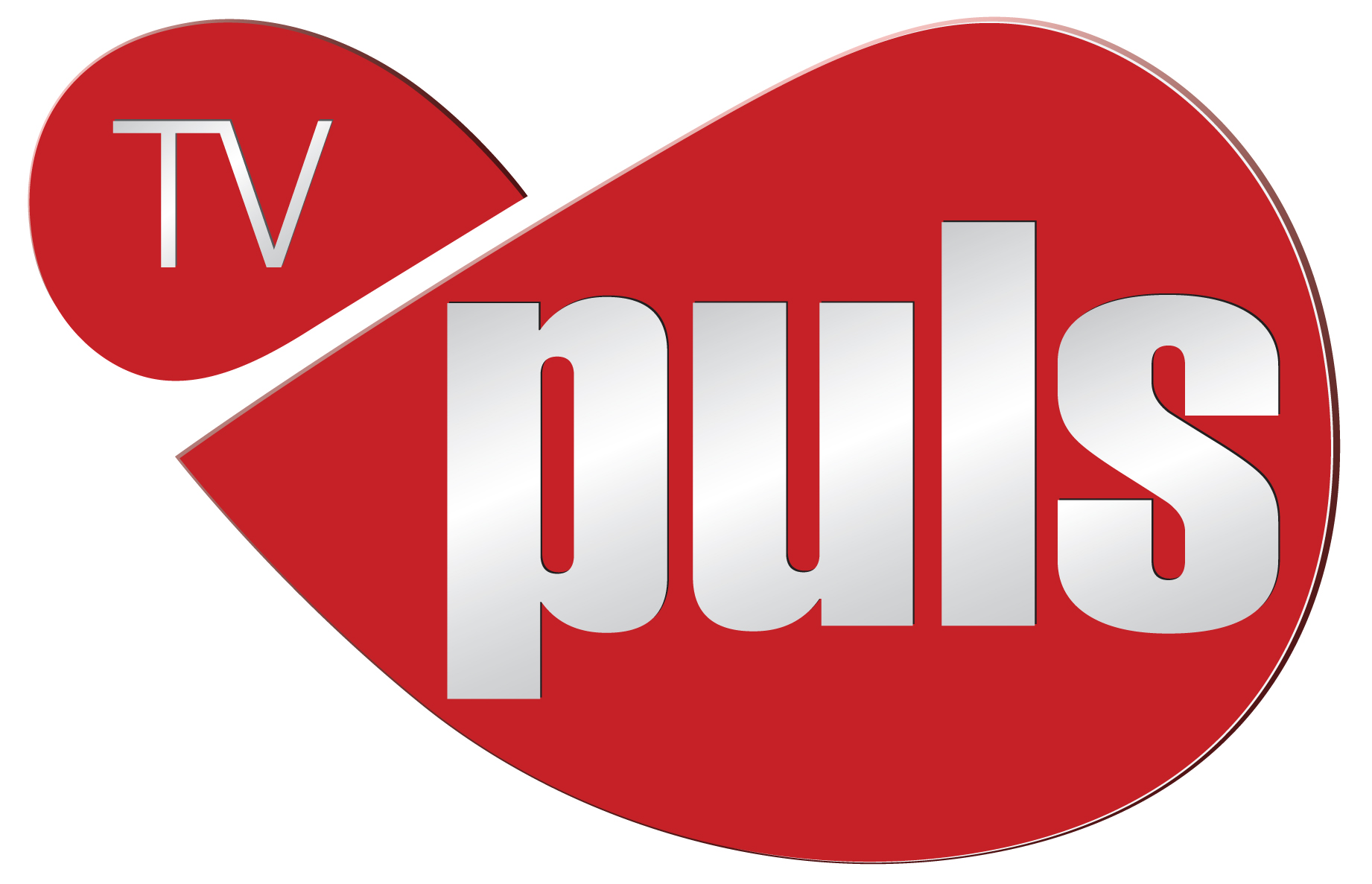
- Country: Poland

Programming
- Language: Polish
- Picture format: 16:9/4:3 576i (SDTV); 1080i (HDTV)

Ownership
- Owner: Telewizja Puls
- Sister channels: Puls 2

History
- Launched: December 1995 (as TV Niepokalanów); 18 March 2001 (as TV Puls); (hiatus from 1 April–24 June 2003); 25 June 2003 (as TV Niepokalanów Puls); 6 December 2003 (as TV Puls)
- Former names: TV Niepokalanów (December 1995–2001); TV Niepokalanów Puls (June–December 2003)

Links
- Website: tvpuls.pl (in Polish)

Availability

Terrestrial
- Polish Digital: MUX 2 (SD) (Channel 7)

TV Puls is a Polish commercial television channel, which was based on Telewizja Niepokalanów with the support of companies such as PKN Orlen, KGHM Polska Miedź, PZU Życie, Prokom and which started broadcasting in March 2001. Due to financial problems, it ended broadcasting on 1 April 2003. With the help of the private company Antena 1 and of the owner of Polsat, Zygmunt Solorz-Żak, TV Puls resumed broadcasting in June 2003. Until recently, the station's programming was largely devoted to Catholic issues, as the majority of the company's stock was owned by the Franciscan Order.

In 2006 News Corporation acquired 35% of the stock and began a major overhaul of the programming. On 28 October 2007, the channel were revised with a new logo and a more mainstream target group, as well as it starts to broadcast a new information program: Puls Raport. However, on 16 July 2008, it was decided to remove the program from the schedule, and the reason for this decision was the poor audience share results and the excessively high costs of production. Later on 3 November 2008, it was announced that News Corporation has sold its 35% stake to the remaining shareholders.

The channel develops. It gives many entertainment programs, series and documentaries. TV Puls in June 2010 received a license to broadcast channel for children and young people Puls 2 (launched on 19 July 2012).

== History ==
=== Predecessor channel (Telewizja Niepokalanów, 1995-2001) ===
Telewizja Niepokalanów was launched on 1 December 1995 by the Franciscan Order. They also owned a broadcasting license via several terrestrial transmitters located, among others, in Warsaw, Kraków and Łódź. The station's range covered over half of the Polish population.

The intention of the station's creators was to evangelize the Polish population. Live broadcasts of important religious events were broadcast on the air, special programs concerning the Roman Catholic Church, feature films, reportages and an information program - "Tydzień w Kościele – Przegląd Wydarzeń" (A Week in the Church - Overview of Events) were broadcast. In addition, cultural and music programs, such as the "Musical Window" (Muzyczne Okienko), aimed at evangelization through music. The invited artists presented a life full of essential values. Among the guests were: Jan Pospieszalski, Mieczysław Szcześniak, Beata Kozidrak, Urszula, Ryszard Rynkowski, Krzysztof Krawczyk and Jacek Kaczmarski. This station's schedule was maintained until the end of February 2001, when it was replaced by TV Puls.

The creators of TV Niepokalanów wanted to continue their work by launching a de facto successor channel called Telewizja Niepokalanów II. The channel started on 12 August 2001 and shut down on 25 June 2003, caused by the financial problems at TV Puls, whose collapse in its formula at the time led to the creation of TN2.

=== Family channel (2001-2003) ===
TV Puls was established on the basis of the former Telewizja Niepokalanów thanks to the support of state-owned companies (PKN Orlen, KGHM Polska Miedź, Polskie Sieci Elektroenergetyczne, PZU Życie) and Prokom by the Franciscan Order.

The company initially broadcasting the TV Puls program was called Telewizja Familijna S.A. The station began broadcasting on 18 March 2001 on the terrestrial and satellite frequencies of TV Niepokalanów. TV Puls' flagship news program was Wydarzenia TV Puls, presented, among others, by Bogdan Rymanowski and Magda Mołek. The main current affairs magazine was the Raport Specjalny edited by Jacek Łęski - a program dealing with topics in the field of investigative journalism.

TV Puls quickly lost financial liquidity due to excessive spending and withdrawal from Prokom. On 28 May 2002 the flagship news program Wydarzenia was taken off the air and replaced by the much cheaper Serwis Pulsu. In October 2002, TV Puls started switching off terrestrial transmitters. The debt of TV Familijna reached US$130 million. On 1 April 2003 TV Puls ended broadcasting.

=== Antena 1 (2003-2006) ===
Soon the station's help was offered by the private company Antena 1, thanks to which the station resumed terrestrial and satellite broadcasting on 25 June 2003, simultaneously cutting itself off from the indebted company "Telewizja Familijna". In August 2003 the owner of Polsat, Zygmunt Solorz, declared support for TV Puls. Since then, the station has been broadcasting under the name TV Niepokalanów Puls. The original name returned on 6 December 2003, when the then-current look came on the air. TV Puls also cooperated with Polsat in advertising matters and in the production of programs by Antena 1, a company related to Polsat. The station in its broadcasting license had a Christian and family character. In June 2006 Zygmunt Solorz-Żak withdrew from TV Puls.

=== News Corporation (2006-2008) ===
On 28 June 2006 it was announced that approximately 25% of shares in the station are controlled by a new foreign investor, News Corporation, owned by the media magnate - Rupert Murdoch. Thanks to this investment, the station was supposed to generate income and started producing new programs. In January 2007, thanks to the changes to the concession terms, TV Puls ceased to be a religious and social television, and began to be a universal channel with programs on family-Christian topics. The program was filled mainly with feature films and series.

As of April 2007, News Corporation owned 35% of the shares. On 28 October 2007 changes took place on Puls TV, especially with regard to the journalistic and informative side. On that day, the new channel scheduling was implemented. The hosts of the new Puls Raport news service at 19:30 and 22:00 were, among others Krzysztof Ziemiec, Katarzyna Trzaskalska, Katarzyna Olubińska, Piotr Maślak, Paulina Drapała, Katarzyna Niedźwiedź-Szałajko, Michał Siegieda and Marek Pyza. On the same day, the station's logo and graphic design changed. On 15 January 2008 the National Broadcasting Council granted TV Puls additional terrestrial TV transmitters in Wrocław and Szczecin. They were launched on 30 April 2008; later a transmitter was also launched in Katowice.

On 29 February 2008 the station's president, Farell Meisel, was replaced by Dariusz Dąbski. On 16 July 2008 the last edition of the Puls Raport program was aired, which was taken off the air due to too high maintenance costs in relation to revenues.

=== Changes and search for investors (2008-2010) ===
On 1 September 2008 TV Puls changed its logo and graphic design again. On 3 November 2008 News Corporation informed about selling 35% of shares in TV Puls to other shareholders.

On 24 July 2009 the station again applied for a change in the license provisions so that it could broadcast a generalist format. Ultimately, the National Broadcasting Council complied with the broadcaster's request. Permanent religious programs were no longer available in the fall schedule of 2009.

From 31 August 2009 TV Puls also started broadcasting animated series intended for children, in the morning schedule Stacja Porankowo there were Polish animated series such as The Enchanted Crayon (Zaczarowany ołówek), Bolek and Lolek, Reksio, etc. In the evening schedule of Junior TV, there were international series like: Gadget and the Gadgetinis, Once Upon a Time... Man, The Flintstones, W.I.T.C.H. The Jetsons, Tom and Jerry, Peter Pan and the Pirates, Simsala Grimm, Pixie and Dixie and Mr. Jinks, etc.

At the beginning of October 2009, the shareholder structure in the station changed. The 75% stake was taken over by the station's president, Dariusz Dąbski, and the 25% stake in the company is owned by the Province of the Order of Friars Minor Conventual (Franciscan Fathers).

In the same year, TV Puls informed about plans to launch an internet television devoted to religious affairs in the future, as well as a channel for children. In October 2009, the station reached the break-even point, and in November it made a profit.

In January 2010, TV Puls acquired the rights to show one of the WWE programs - WWE Superstars. It was broadcast on Wednesdays at 20:30.

On 22 February 2010 25% of the shares of the stations previously owned by the Province of the Order of Friars Minor Conventual was taken over by the station's president - Dariusz Dąbski, as a result of which he took full control of the station. At the same time, he informed that the channel would no longer be looking for an investor, but would focus on developing the programming offer.

=== Digitalization (2010 onwards) ===
From 5 to 11 April 2010, TV Puls was ahead of TV4 and TVN 7 in terms of viewership, ranking 7th in the list of the 20 most watched stations according to AGB Nielsen (with a score of 1.93%). In mid-May 2010, the station slightly modified its programming, introducing a few new programs. At the same time, it applied to the National Broadcasting Council for a license to launch a new TV channel under the working name of Puls Kids, which eventually became Puls 2. It is to be broadcast via satellite, and ultimately terrestrial via MUX-2.

On 29 September 2010 an agreement was signed in which TV Puls transferred the right to broadcast the digital multiplex signal to Emitel. Thus, the channel appeared in digital terrestrial television (DVB-T) in the 2nd multiplex, systematically implemented in Poland. The 2nd digital multiplex began airing on 30 September 2010.

In December 2010, the station began working with TVN. The cooperation was aimed at selling advertising time on TV Puls by TVN. The cooperation was concluded for 10 years and at the end of 2020 it was replaced by an agreement with the Polsat Media advertising office belonging to Telewizja Polsat. From 7 November 2011 the station broadcasts alternately in two picture formats - 16:9 and 4:3. Previously, it broadcast its signal in fixed 4:3, and 16:9 programs were broadcast in letterbox.

On 19 July 2012 the second channel, Puls 2, was launched. On 11 March 2013 TV Puls received Telekamera 2013 in the lifestyle channel category. On 20 May 2013 TV Puls switched off the last terrestrial analog transmitters. Thus, TV Puls is the first nationwide terrestrial broadcaster to terminate analogue terrestrial broadcasting. On 10 February 2014, between 9:00 and 10:00, TV Puls was encrypted on the Hot Bird satellite, and on 2 September 2014 TV Puls launched its HD feed, initially available only on cable networks, and from 19 October 2016 also on satellite.

On 10 April 2016 the TV Puls channel, for the first time in history, took 3rd place in the daily viewership results in the commercial audience group 16-49 (6%), ahead of TVP1 and TVP2.

On 15 April 2021 Puls 2 appeared on the Cyfrowy Polsat platform on channel 157.

== Programming ==
=== Information ===
- Taki jest świat (the weekly magazine with information from the world, own production)

=== Series ===
- Code Black (Stan alarmu)
- Scorpion (Skorpion)
- The Librarians (Bibliotekarze)
- Vikings (Wikingowie)
- Relic Hunter (Łowcy skarbów)
- Jake and the Fatman (Gliniarz i prokurator)
- Murder, She Wrote (Napisała: morderstwo)
- Nash Bridges
- Keeping Up Appearances (Co ludzie powiedzą?)
- 'Allo 'Allo!
- Alarm für Cobra 11 – Die Autobahnpolizei (Kobra - oddział specjalny)
- Os Dez Mandamentos (Dziesięć przykazań)
- La esclava blanca (Niewolnica Victoria)
- Mi corazón insiste en Lola Volcán (Moje serce bije dla Loli)
- Sıla (TV series) (Sila: odnaleźć przeznaczenie)
- O Hayat Benim (To moje życie!)

==== Polish series ====
Production of TVN:

- Niania
- 13 posterunek

=== Documentary series ===
- Podniebny horror (Mayday)
- Szpital - nagłe przypadki (Untold Stories of the E.R.)
- Szok Video (World's Most Amazing Videos)
- Shockwave
- Austin Stevens: Na szlaku drapieżników (Austin Stevens Adventures)
- Niebezpieczne spotkania (Dangerous Encounters)
- Przedziwny świat owadów (Buggin' with Ruud)
- Dzika natura (Corwin's Quest)
- Pracujące zwierzaki (Animals at Work)

==== Own production ====
- Wojciech Cejrowski. Boso (Wojciech Cejrowski. Barefoot)
- Dyżur
- JRG w akcji
- Z archiwum policji
- Zbrodnie niedoskonałe

=== Animated series ===
- Pingwiny z Madagaskaru (The Penguins of Madagascar)
- Alvin i wiewiórki (Alvin and the Chipmunks)
- Niech żyje król Julian (All Hail King Julien)

==== Upcoming ====
- SamSam

=== Game show ===
- Następny proszę! (Avanti un altro!)

== Previous programs ==
=== Information ===
- Wydarzenia TV Puls (2001–2002)
- Serwis Pulsu (2002–2003)
- Puls Raport (2007–2008)
- Wydarzenia dnia (2008–2009)

=== Game shows ===
- Czy jesteś mądrzejszy od 5-klasisty? (the Polish version of Are You Smarter Than a 5th Grader?)
- Singa Dinga (the Polish version of Sing-A-Song)

=== Reality shows ===
- Najgorszy Polski Kierowca (the Polish version of Britain's Worst Driver)
- Co masz do stracenia? (the Polish version of The Biggest Loser)
- Sędzia Judy (Judge Judy)
- Strach się bać (Scare Tactics)
- Egzekutorzy (Operation Repo)
- SWAT

=== Foreign series ===
- Przygody Sindbada Żeglarza (The Adventures of Sinbad)
- Brygada ratunkowa (Third Watch)
- Nowe przygody Robin Hooda (The New Adventures of Robin Hood)
- Strażnik pierścienia (Lasko – Die Faust Gottes)
- Gra o życie (Casualty)
- Jednostka specjalna (GSG 9 – Ihr Einsatz ist ihr Leben)
- Gliniarz z Memphis (Memphis Beat)
- Wydział śledczy RIS (RIS Delitti Imperfetti)
- Miami Medical
- Wyścig z czasem (Countdown – Die Jagd beginnt)
- Medicopter 117
- McGregorowie (Snowy River: The McGregor Saga)
- Medium
- Pokojówka na Mannhattanie (Una Maid en Manhattan)
- Ja, ona i Eva (Por Ella Soy Eva)
- Miłość i przeznaczenie (La Fuerza del Destino)
- Burza uczuć (Sturm der Liebe)
- To, co najważniejsze (Alles was zählt)
- Koń, który mówi (Mister Ed)
- Pełna chata (Full House)
- Jim wie lepiej (According to Jim)
- Pomoc domowa (The Nanny)
- Pustynna miłość (El Clon)
- Duch Eleny (El Fantasma de Elena)
- Gdzie jest Elisa? (¿Dónde Está Elisa?)
- American Dreams
- Robin Hood (Robin of Sherwood)
- Star Trek
- MacGyver
- Nieśmiertelny (Highlander: The Series)
- Wszyscy kochają Raymonda (Everybody Loves Raymond)
- Will & Grace
- Dzieciaki z Einstein High (Schloss Einstein)
- B.A.R.Z (Ein Fall für B.A.R.Z.)
- Simpsonowie (The Simpsons)

=== Documentary series ===
- Wojownicy wszech czasów (Deadliest Warrior)
- Alarm na plaży (Beach Patrol)
- Ludzie, zwierzeta i doktorzy (Menschen, Tiere & Doktoren)
- Obieżyświat (Globe Trekker)
- Zwykłe rzeczy - niezwykłe wynalazki (How Do They Do It?)
- Najniebezpieczniejszy zawód świata (Deadliest Catch)
- Wielkie przeprowadzki (Mega Movers)

=== Lifestyle programs ===
- Martha Stewart: Inspiracje (Martha Stewart: Crafts')
- Gotuj jak Mistrz (Cook Like a Chef)
- Słodki świat Rachel (Rachel Allen: Bake!)
- Uwaga! Nadchodzi Kim! (Kim's Rude Awakenings)
- Perfekcyjne panny młode (Bulging Brides)
- Moda na cenzurowanym (Naked Fashion)
- Zostań gwiazdą! (Rags to Red Carpet)
- Domy nie do sprzedania (The Unsellables)
- Debbie zmienia wnętrza (Debbie Travis' Facelift)
- Test na Super Mamę (Crash Test Mommy)
- 10 lat mniej (10 Years Younger)

==== Own production ====
- Menu na miarę - culinary program, led by Olga Głębicka
- No problem! - magazine with tips for women, led by Erin Murphy

=== Talk shows ===
- Dr. Phil
- Jerry Springer Show

=== Entertainment ===
- Króliczki Playboya (The Girls Next Door)
- Goło i wesoło (Naked & Funny)
- Ale numer (Just For Laughs Gags)
- Uwaga, żarty! (Just kidding!)
- Niezły numer (Distraction Gags)
- Od zera do bohatera (Zero to Hero)
- UFC Unleashed
- WWE Superstars
- W kręgu MMA
- Spotkanie z balladą (production of Telewizja Polska)

==== Own production ====
- Stare dranie - a hidden camera with older people, hosted by Andrzej Grabowski
- Kręcimy z gwiazdami - hosted by Ewelina Kopic
- Hi Hi TV
- Dziewczyny na ekran
