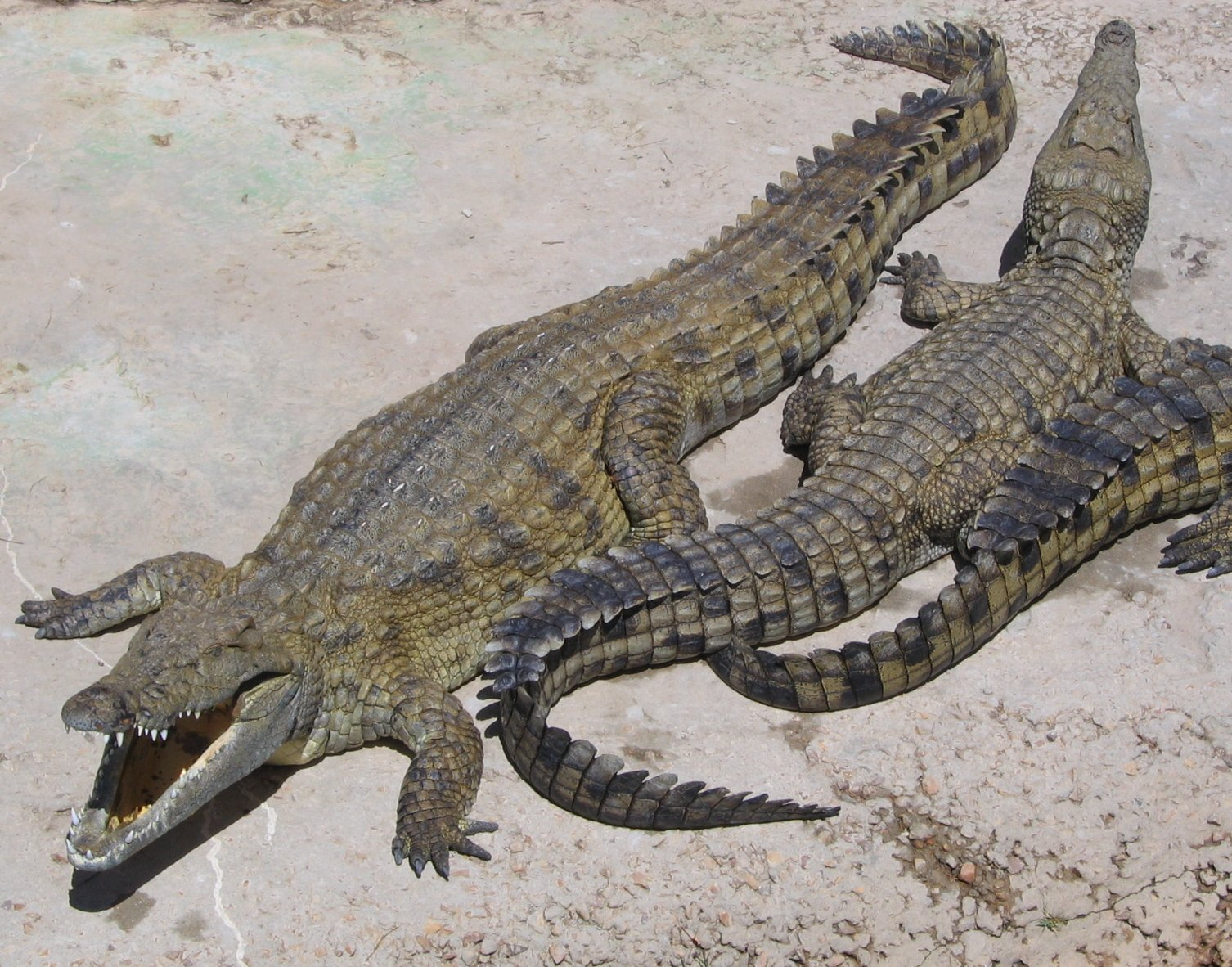
- At Le Bonheur Crocodile Farm near Stellenbosch, South Africa

Conservation status
- Least Concern (IUCN 3.1)
- CITES Appendix I (Note: Except the populations of Botswana, Egypt, Ethiopia, Kenya, Madagascar, Malawi, Mozambique, Namibia, South Africa, Uganda, Tanzania, Zambia and Zimbabwe which are included in CITES Appendix II.)

Scientific classification
- Kingdom: Animalia
- Phylum: Chordata
- Class: Reptilia
- Order: Crocodylia
- Family: Crocodylidae
- Genus: Crocodylus
- Species: C. niloticus

Binomial name
- Crocodylus niloticus Laurenti, 1768
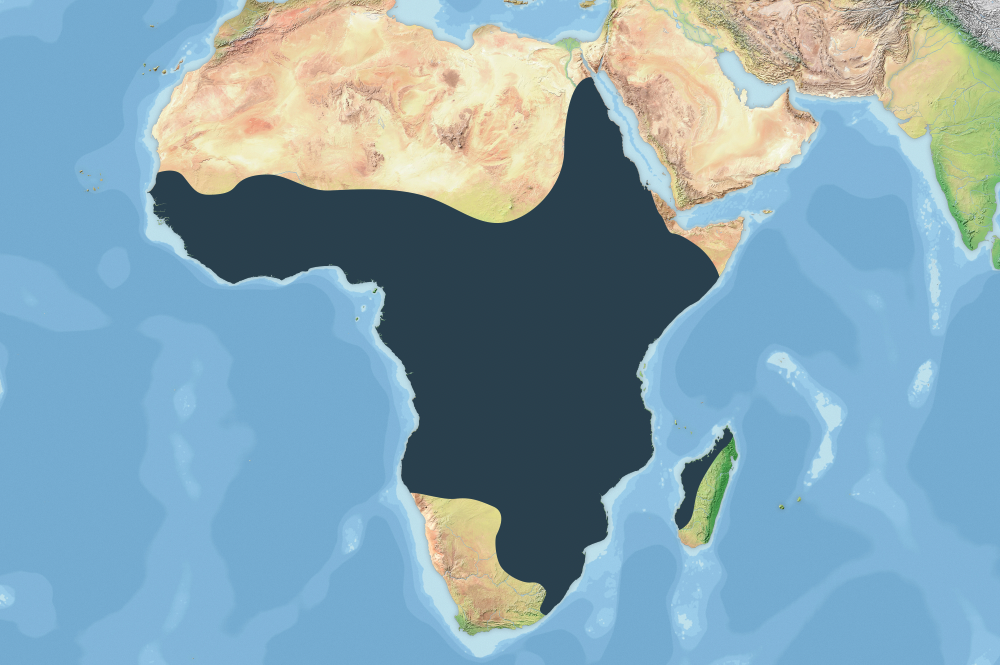
- approximate range in the broad sense (true area of occupancy considerably smaller and western African populations now considered to belong to the West African crocodile)
- Distribution of the Nile crocodile as of 2017

Synonyms
- Crocodylus vulgaris Cuvier, 1802

= Nile crocodile =

Nile crocodile Temporal range: Late Miocene–Present, 7–0 Ma

Reptile of Africa

The Nile crocodile (Crocodylus niloticus) is a large crocodilian native to freshwater habitats in Africa, where it is present in 26 countries. It is widely distributed in sub-Saharan Africa, occurring mostly in the eastern, southern, and central regions of the continent, and lives in different types of aquatic environments such as lakes, rivers, swamps and marshlands. It occasionally inhabits deltas, brackish lakes and rarely also saltwater. Its range once stretched from the Nile Delta throughout the Nile River. Lake Turkana in Kenya has one of the largest undisturbed Nile crocodile populations.

Generally, the adult male Nile crocodile is between 3.5 and 5 m (11 ft 6 in and 16 ft 5 in) in length and weighs 225 to 750 kg (496 to 1,653 lb). However, specimens exceeding 6.1 m (20 ft) in length and 1,000 kg (2,200 lb) in weight have been recorded. It is the largest predator in Africa, and may be considered the second-largest extant reptile in the world, after the saltwater crocodile (Crocodylus porosus). Size is sexually dimorphic, with females usually about 30% smaller than males. The crocodile has thick, scaly, heavily armoured skin.

Nile crocodiles are opportunistic apex predators, being capable of taking on almost any animal within their range. They are generalists, taking a variety of prey, with a diet consisting mostly of different species of fish, reptiles, birds, and mammals. As ambush predators, they can wait for hours, days, and even weeks for the suitable moment to attack. They are agile predators and wait for the opportunity for a prey item to come well within attack range. Even swift prey are not immune to attack. Like other crocodiles, Nile crocodiles have a powerful bite that is unique among all animals, and sharp, conical teeth that sink into flesh, allowing a grip that is almost impossible to loosen. They can apply high force for extended periods of time, a great advantage for holding down large prey underwater to drown.

Nile crocodiles are relatively social amongst themselves. They share basking spots and large food sources, such as schools of fish and big carcasses. Their strict hierarchy is determined by size. Large, old males are at the top of this hierarchy and have first access to food and the best basking spots. Crocodiles tend to respect this order; when it is infringed, the results are often violent and sometimes fatal. Like most other reptiles, Nile crocodiles lay eggs; these are guarded by the females but also males, making the Nile crocodiles one of few reptile species whose males contribute to parental care. The hatchlings are also protected for a period of time, but hunt by themselves and are not fed by the parents.

The Nile crocodile is one of the most dangerous species of crocodile and is responsible for hundreds of human deaths every year. It is common and is not endangered, despite some regional declines or extirpations in the Maghreb.

== Etymology and naming ==
The binomial name Crocodylus niloticus is derived from the Greek κρόκη, kroke ("pebble"), δρῖλος, drilos ("worm"), referring to its rough skin; and niloticus, meaning "from the Nile River". The Nile crocodile is called timsah al-nil in Arabic, mamba in Swahili, yaxaas in Somali, garwe in Shona, ngwenya in Ndebele, ngwena in Venda, kwena in Sotho and Tswana, and tanin ha-yeor in Hebrew. It also sometimes referred to as the African crocodile, Ethiopian crocodile, and common crocodile.

== Taxonomy ==
Although no subspecies are currently formally recognized, as many as seven have been proposed, mostly due to variations in appearance and size noted in various populations throughout Africa. These have consisted of C. n. africanus (informally named the East African Nile crocodile), C. n. chamses (the West African Nile crocodile), C. n. cowiei (the South African Nile crocodile), C. n. madagascariensis (the Malagasy or Madagascar Nile crocodile, regionally also known as the croco Mada, which translates to Malagasy crocodile), C. n. niloticus (the Ethiopian Nile crocodile; this would be the nominate subspecies), C. n. pauciscutatus (the Kenyan Nile crocodile) and C. (n.) suchus (now widely considered a separate species).

In a study of the morphology of the various populations, including C. (n.) suchus, the appearance of the Nile crocodile sensu lato was found to be more variable than that of any other currently recognized crocodile species, and at least some of these variations were related to locality. For example, a study on Lake Turkana in Kenya (informally this population would be placed in C. n. pauciscutatus) found that the local crocodiles have more osteoderms in their ventral surface than other known populations, and thus are of lesser value in leather trading, accounting for an exceptionally large (possibly overpopulated) local population there in the late 20th century. The segregation of the West African crocodile (C. suchus) from the Nile crocodile has been supported by morphological characteristics, studies of genetic materials and habitat preferences. The separation of the two is not recognized by the IUCN as their last evaluations of the group was in 2008 and 2009, years before the primary publications supporting the distinctiveness of the West African crocodiles.

== Evolution ==
Although originally thought to be the same species as the West African crocodile, genetic studies using DNA sequencing have revealed that the Nile crocodile is actually more closely related to the crocodiles of the Americas, namely the American (C. acutus), Cuban (C. rhombifer), Morelet's (C. moreletii), and Orinoco crocodiles (C. intermedius). The extant Nile crocodiles first appeared during the Late Miocene-Early Pliocene in Kenya based on fossil remains dated to approximately 7 to 5 million years ago, and the related fossil species C. checchiai from the same strata was similar in size and shared similar physical characteristics to this specific species.

At one time, the fossil species Rimasuchus lloydi was thought to be the closest relative of the Nile crocodile, but more recent research has indicated that Rimasuchus, despite its very large size (about 20–30% bigger than a Nile crocodile with a skull length estimated up to 97 cm (38 in)), is more closely related to the dwarf crocodile (Osteolaemus tetraspis) among living species. Two other fossil species from Africa retained in the genus Crocodylus appear to be closely related to the Nile crocodile: C. anthropophagus from Plio-Pleistocene Tanzania and C. thorbjarnarsoni from Plio-Pleistocene Kenya. C. anthropophagus and C. thorbjarnarsoni were both somewhat larger, with projected total lengths up to 7.5–7.6 m (24 ft 7 in – 24 ft 11 in). As well as being larger, C. anthropophagus and C. thorbjarnarsoni, as well as Rimasuchus spp., were all relatively broad-snouted, indicating a specialization at hunting sizeable prey, such as large mammals and freshwater turtles, the latter much larger than any in present-day Africa. Studies have since shown these other African crocodiles to be only more distantly related to the Nile crocodile.

Below is a cladogram based on a 2018 tip dating study by Lee & Yates simultaneously using morphological, molecular (DNA sequencing), and stratigraphic (fossil age) data, as revised by the 2021 Hekkala et al. paleogenomics study using DNA extracted from the extinct Voay. Hall's New Guinea crocodile placement suggested in 2023 study by Sales-Oliveira et al.

- Crocodylinae
  - Voay
    Voay robustus †
  - Crocodylus
    - - - Crocodylus anthropophagus †
        - Crocodylus thorbjarnarsoni †
      - - Crocodylus palaeindicus †
        - Crocodylus Tirari Desert †
    - - - - - - - - Crocodylus johnstoni Freshwater crocodile
          - - - - - Crocodylus novaeguineae New Guinea crocodile
              - - - Crocodylus halli Hall's New Guinea crocodile
            - - - - Crocodylus mindorensis Philippine crocodile
        - - - - - - Crocodylus porosus Saltwater crocodile
          - - - - - Crocodylus siamensis Siamese crocodile
            - - - - Crocodylus palustris Mugger crocodile
      - - - - - - - Crocodylus suchus West African crocodile
          - - - - - Crocodylus niloticus Nile crocodile
            - - - - Crocodylus rhombifer Cuban crocodile
              - - - Crocodylus intermedius Orinoco crocodile
                  - Crocodylus acutus American crocodile
                - - Crocodylus moreletii Morelet's crocodile
        - - Crocodylus checchiai †
          - Crocodylus falconensis †

== Characteristics and physiology ==
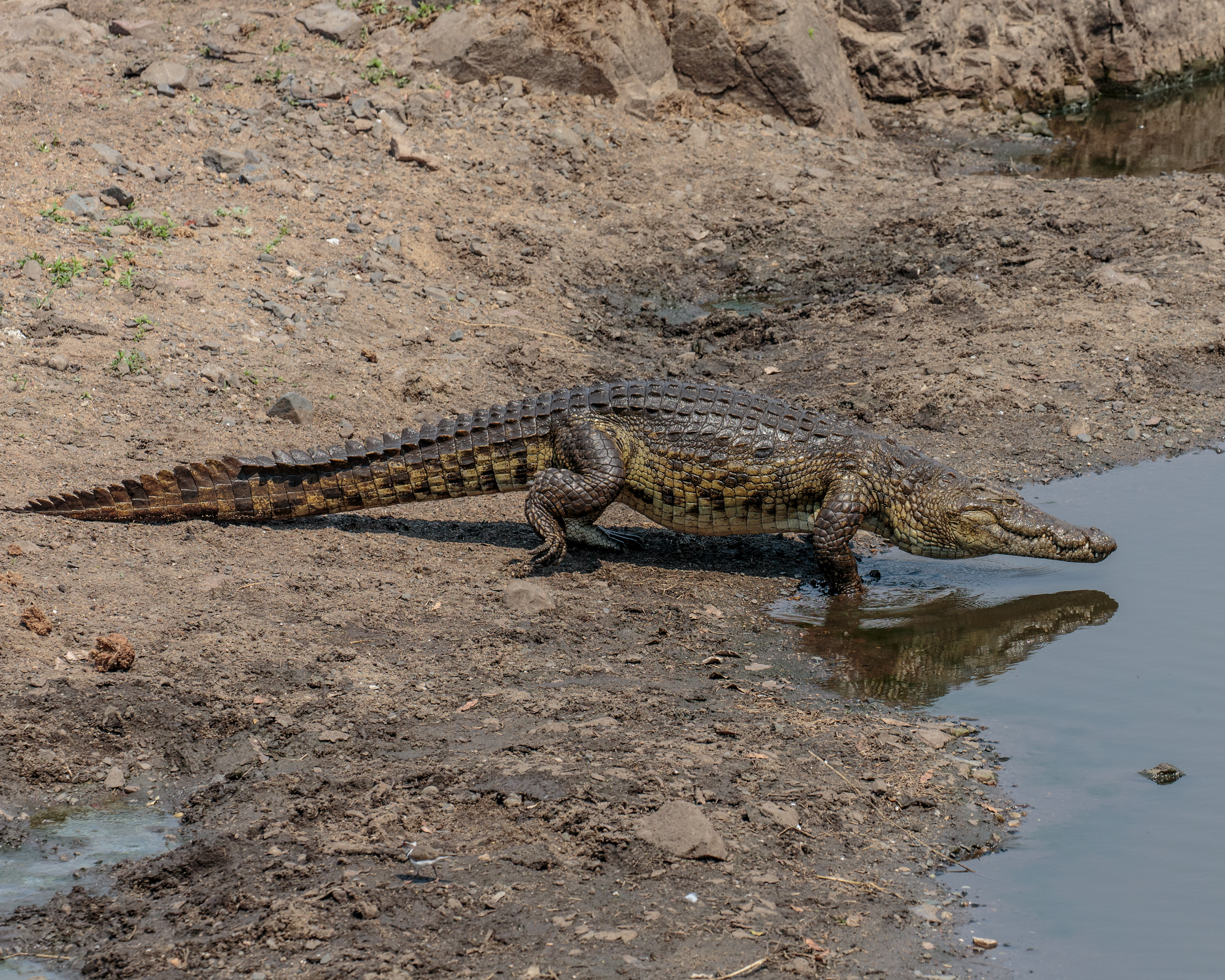
Side view in South Africa

Adult Nile crocodiles have a dark bronze colouration above, with faded blackish spots and stripes variably appearing across the back and a dingy off-yellow on the belly, although mud can often obscure the crocodile's actual colour. The flanks, which are yellowish-green in colour, have dark patches arranged in oblique stripes in highly variable patterns. Some variation occurs relative to environment; specimens from swift-flowing waters tend to be lighter in colour than those dwelling in murkier lakes or swamps, which provides camouflage that suits their environment, an example of clinal variation. Nile crocodiles have green eyes. The colouration also helps to camouflage them; juveniles are grey, multicoloured, or brown, with dark cross-bands on the tail and body. The underbelly of young crocodiles is yellowish green. As they mature, Nile crocodiles become darker and the cross-bands fade, especially those on the upper-body. A similar tendency in coloration change during maturation has been noted in most crocodile species.

Most morphological attributes of Nile crocodiles are typical of crocodilians as a whole. Like all crocodilians, for example, the Nile crocodile is a quadruped with four short, splayed legs, a long, powerful tail, a scaly hide with rows of ossified scutes running down its back and tail, and powerful, elongated jaws. Their skin has a number of poorly understood integumentary sense organs that may react to changes in water pressure, presumably allowing them to track prey movements in the water. The Nile crocodile has fewer osteoderms on the belly, which are much more conspicuous on some of the more modestly sized crocodilians. The species, however, also has small, oval osteoderms on the sides of the body, as well as the throat. The Nile crocodile shares with all crocodilians a nictitating membrane to protect the eyes and lachrymal glands to cleanse its eyes with tears. The nostrils, eyes, and ears are situated on the top of the head, so the rest of the body can remain concealed under water. They have a four-chambered heart, although modified for their ectothermic nature due to an elongated cardiac septum, physiologically similar to the heart of a bird, which is especially efficient at oxygenating their blood. As in all crocodilians, Nile crocodiles have exceptionally high levels of lactic acid in their blood, which allows them to sit motionless in water for up to 2 hours. Levels of lactic acid as high as they are in a crocodile would kill most vertebrates. However, exertion by crocodilians can lead to death due to increasing lactic acid to lethal levels, which in turn leads to failure of the animal's internal organs. This is rarely recorded in wild crocodiles, normally having been observed in cases where humans have mishandled crocodiles and put them through overly extended periods of physical struggling and stress.

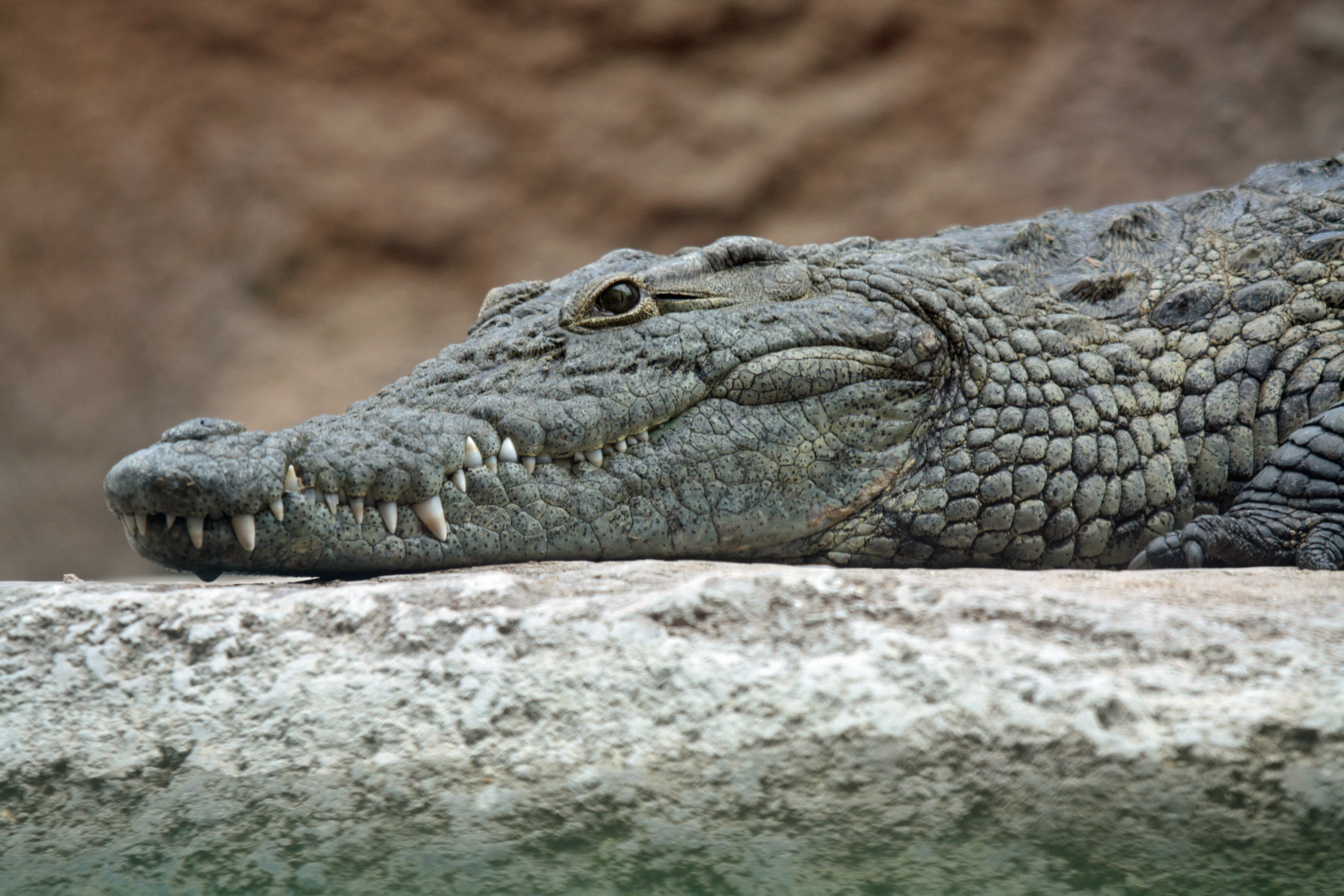
Nile crocodile's head

=== Skull and head morphology ===
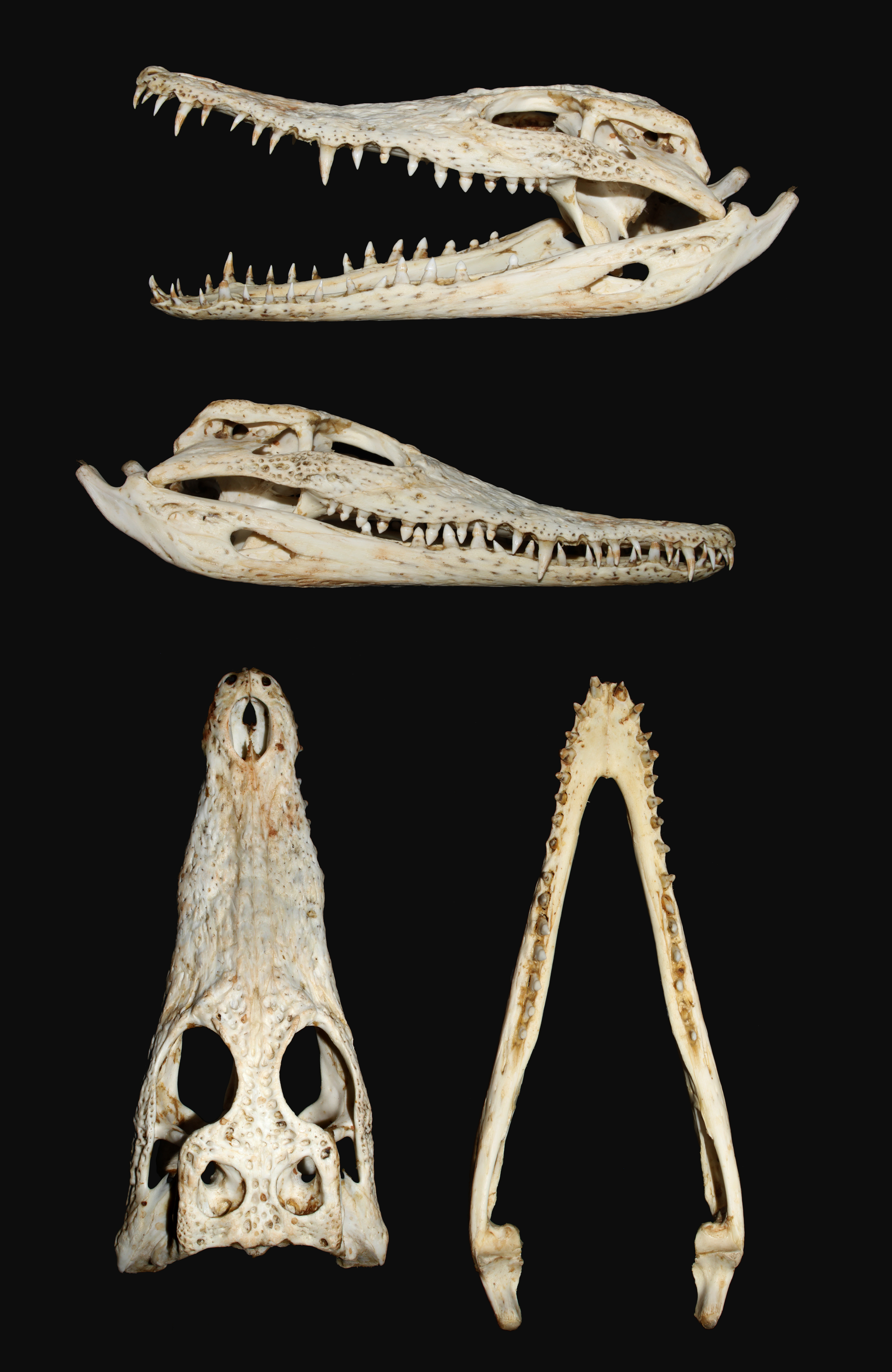
Details of the skull from a juvenile Nile crocodile

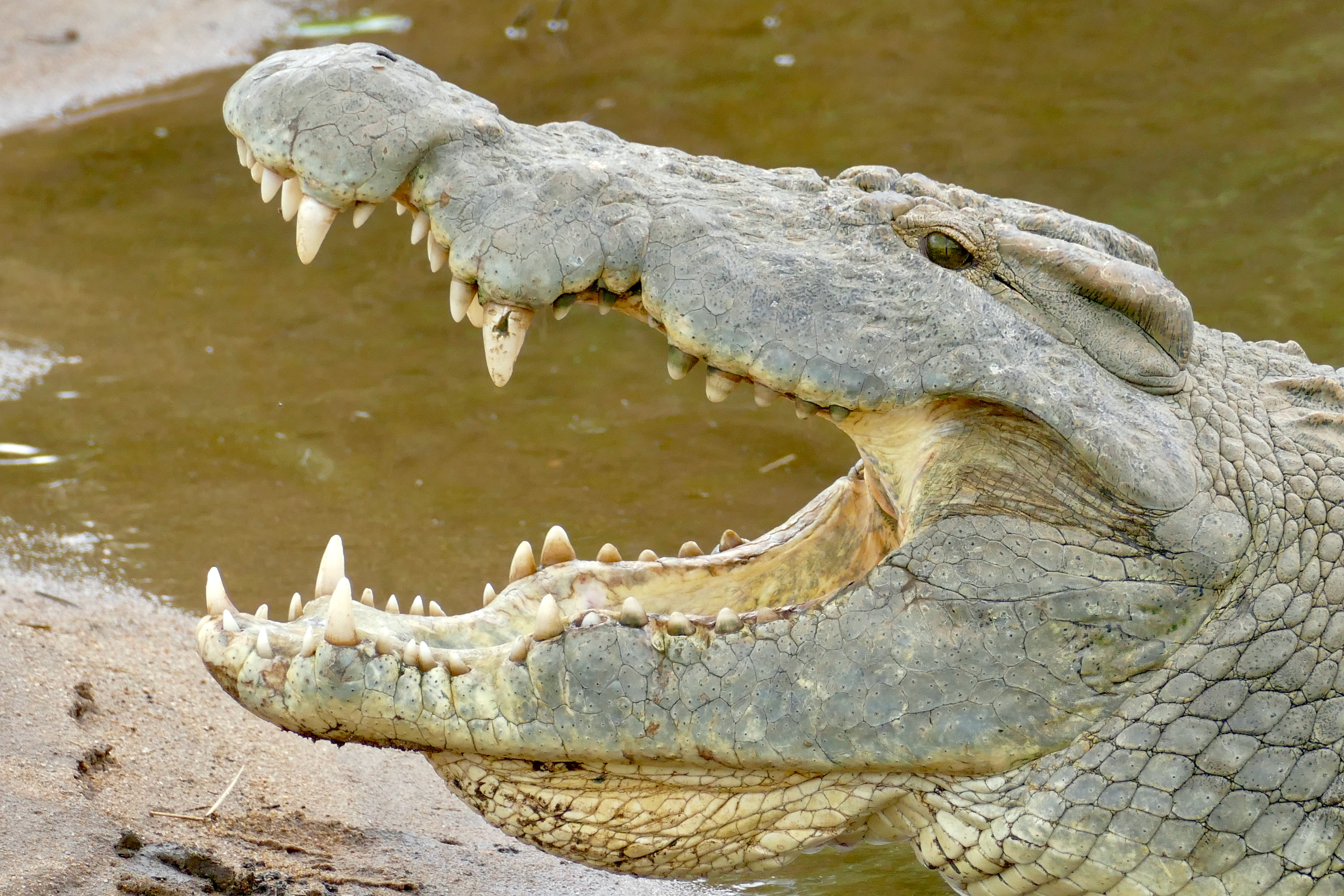
At Kruger National Park, South Africa

The mouths of Nile crocodiles are filled with 64 to 68 sharply pointed, cone-shaped teeth (about a dozen less than alligators have). For most of a crocodile's life, broken teeth can be replaced. On each side of the mouth, five teeth are in the front of the upper jaw (premaxilla), 13 or 14 are in the rest of the upper jaw (maxilla), and 14 or 15 are on either side of the lower jaw (mandible). The enlarged fourth lower tooth fits into the notch on the upper jaw and is visible when the jaws are closed, as is the case with all true crocodiles. Hatchlings quickly lose a hardened piece of skin on the top of their mouths called the egg tooth, which they use to break through their eggshells at hatching. Among crocodilians, the Nile crocodile possesses a relatively long snout, which is about 1.6 to 2.0 times as long as broad at the level of the front corners of the eyes. As is the saltwater crocodile, the Nile crocodile is considered a species with medium-width snout relative to other extant crocodilian species.

In a search for the largest crocodilian skulls in museums, the largest verifiable Nile crocodile skulls found were several housed in Arba Minch, Ethiopia, sourced from nearby Lake Chamo, which apparently included several specimens with a skull length more than 65 cm (26 in), with the largest one being 68.6 cm (27.0 in) in length with a mandibular length of 87 cm (34 in). Nile crocodiles with skulls this size are likely to measure in the range of 5.4 to 5.6 m (17 ft 9 in to 18 ft 4 in), which is also the length of the animals according to the museum where they were found. However, larger skulls may exist, as this study largely focused on crocodilians from Asia. The detached head of an exceptionally large Nile crocodile (killed in 1968 and measuring 5.87 m (19 ft 3 in) in length) was found to have weighed 166 kg (366 lb), including the large tendons used to shut the jaw.

==== Biting force ====
The bite force exerted by an adult Nile crocodile has been shown by Brady Barr to measure 22 kN (5,000 lbf). However, the muscles responsible for opening the mouth are exceptionally weak, allowing a person to easily hold them shut, and even larger crocodiles can be brought under control by the use of duct tape to bind the jaws together. The broadest snouted modern crocodilians are alligators and larger caimans. For example, a 3.9 m (12 ft 10 in) black caiman (Melanosuchus niger) was found to have a notably broader and heavier skull than that of a Nile crocodile measuring 4.8 m (15 ft 9 in). However, despite their robust skulls, alligators and caimans appear to be proportionately equal in biting force to true crocodiles, as the muscular tendons used to shut the jaws are similar in proportional size. Only the gharial (Gavialis gangeticus) (and perhaps some of the few very thin-snouted crocodilians) is likely to have noticeably diminished bite force compared to other living species due to its exceptionally narrow, fragile snout. More or less, the size of the tendons used to impart bite force increases with body size and the larger the crocodilian gets, the stronger its bite is likely to be. Therefore, a male saltwater crocodile, which had attained a length around 4.59 m (15 ft 1 in), was found to have the most powerful biting force ever tested in a lab setting for any type of animal.

=== Size ===
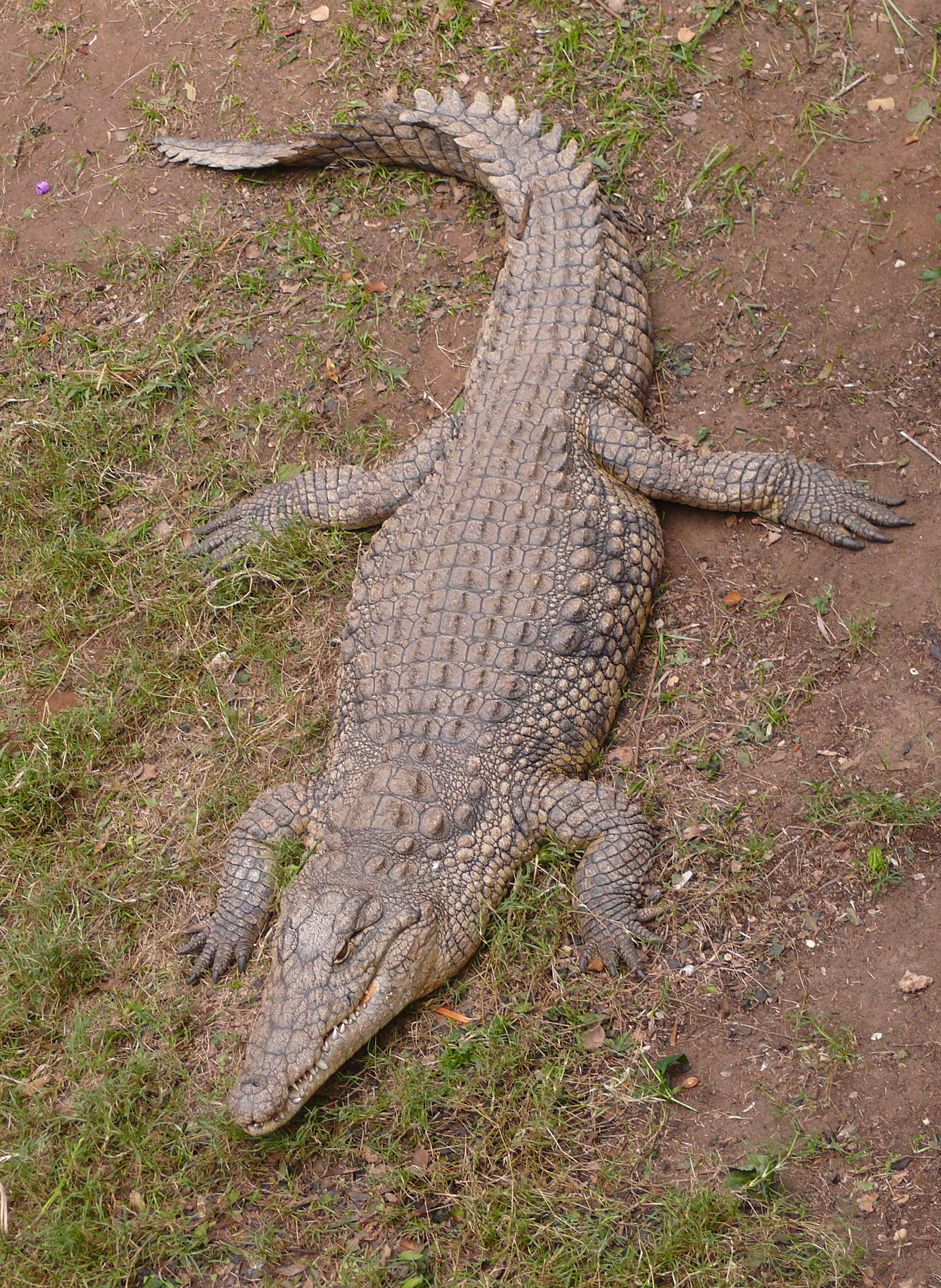
Healthy subadult

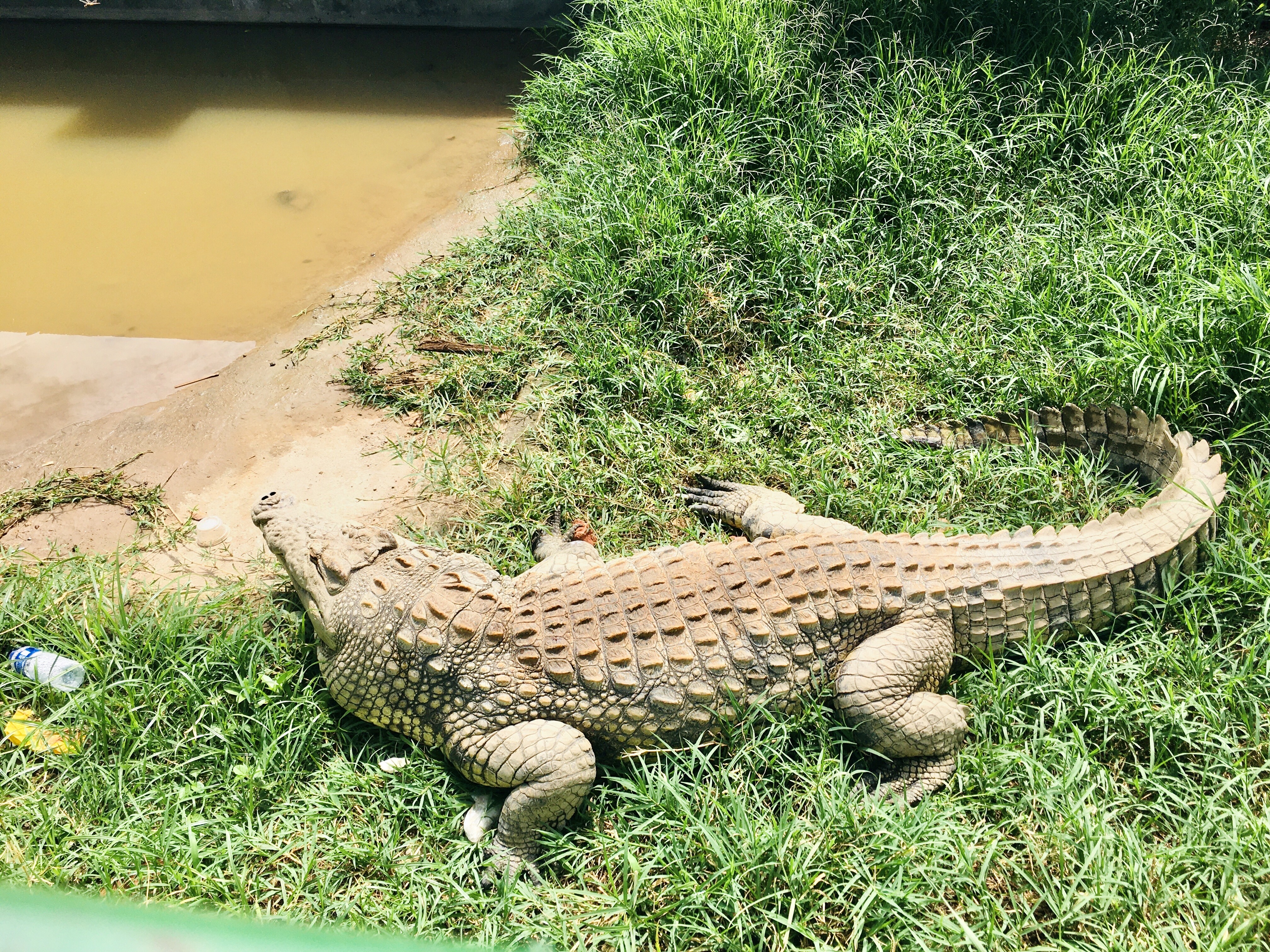
A large Nile crocodile in Entebbe

The Nile crocodile is the largest crocodilian in Africa, and is generally considered the second-largest crocodilian after the saltwater crocodile. Typical size has been reported to be as much as 4.5 to 5.5 m (14 ft 9 in to 18 ft 1 in), but this is excessive for actual average size per most studies and represents the upper limit of sizes attained by the largest animals in a majority of populations. Alexander and Marais (2007) give the typical mature size as 2.8 to 3.5 m (9 ft 2 in to 11 ft 6 in); Garrick and Lang (1977) put it at from 3.0 to 4.5 m (9 ft 10 in to 14 ft 9 in). According to Cott (1961), the average length and weight of Nile crocodiles from Uganda and Zambia in breeding maturity was 3.16 m (10 ft 4 in) and 137.5 kg (303 lb). Per Graham (1968), the average length and weight of a large sample of adult crocodiles from Lake Turkana (formerly known as Lake Rudolf), Kenya was 3.66 m (12 ft 0 in) and body mass of 201.6 kg (444 lb). Similarly, adult crocodiles from Kruger National Park reportedly average 3.65 m (12 ft 0 in) in length. In comparison, the saltwater crocodile and gharial reportedly both average around 4 m (13 ft 1 in), so are about 30 cm (12 in) longer on average, and the false gharial (Tomistoma schlegelii) may average about 3.75 m (12 ft 4 in), so may be slightly longer, as well. However, compared to the narrow-snouted, streamlined gharial and false gharial, the Nile crocodile is more robust and ranks second to the saltwater crocodile in total average body mass among living crocodilians, and is considered to be the second-largest extant reptile. The largest accurately measured male, shot near Mwanza, Tanzania, measured 6.45 m (21 ft 2 in) and weighed about 1,043–1,089 kg (2,300–2,400 lb). Another large male measuring 5.8 m (19 ft 0 in) in total length (Cott 1961) was among the largest Nile crocodiles ever recorded. It was estimated to weigh 1,082 kg (2,385 lb).

==== Size and sexual dimorphism ====
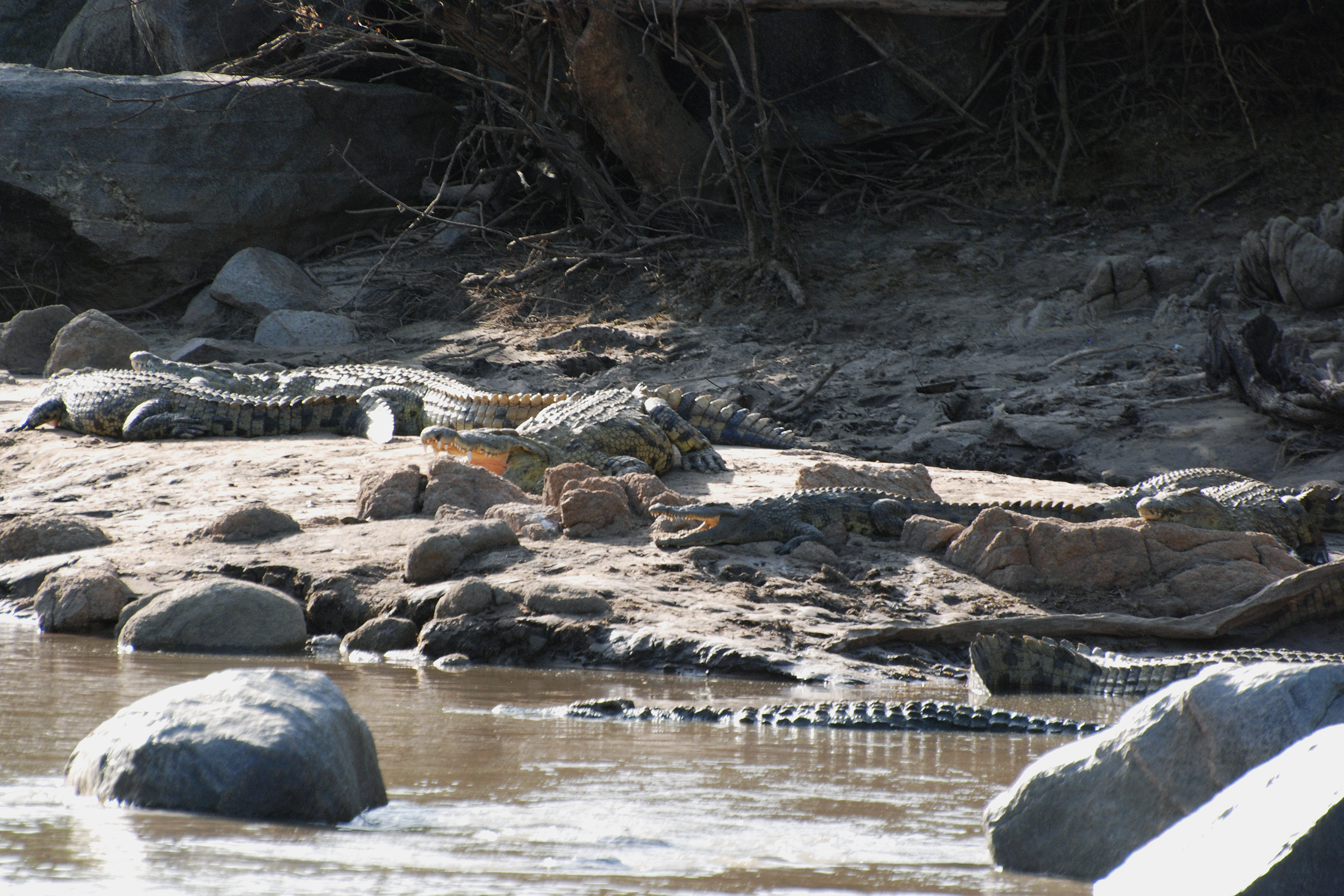
Groupings of crocodiles like this can include crocodiles of various sizes, but seldom of less than 2 m (6 ft 7 in), lest a cannibalistic large specimen launch an attack.

Like all crocodiles, they are sexually dimorphic, with the males up to 30% larger than the females, though the difference is considerably less compared to some species, like the saltwater crocodile. Male Nile crocodiles are about 30 to 50 cm (12 to 20 in) longer on average at sexual maturity and grow more so than females after becoming sexually mature, especially expanding in bulk after exceeding 4 m (13 ft 1 in) in length. Adult male Nile crocodiles usually range in length from 3.3 to 5.0 m (10 ft 10 in to 16 ft 5 in) long; at these lengths, an average sized male may weigh from 150 to 750 kg (330 to 1,650 lb). Very old, mature ones can grow to 5.5 m (18 ft 1 in) or more in length (all specimens over 5.5 m (18 ft 1 in) from 1900 onward are cataloged later). Large mature males can reach 1,000 kg (2,200 lb) or more in weight. Mature female Nile crocodiles typically measure 2.2 to 3.8 m (7 ft 3 in to 12 ft 6 in), at which lengths the average female specimen would weigh 40 to 250 kg (88 to 551 lb).

An old male individual, named "Big Daddy", housed at Mamba Village Centre, Mombasa, Kenya, is considered to be one of the largest living Nile crocodiles in captivity. It measures 15 ft (4.6 m) in length and weighs 2,200 lb (1,000 kg). Another one in Burundi, "Gustave", has been estimated at 20 ft (6.1 m) long and close to 2,000 lb (910 kg); it is believed to have killed hundreds of people.

In 2007, at Katavi National Park, Brady Barr captured a specimen measuring 5.36 m (17 ft 7 in) in total length (with a considerable portion of its tail tip missing). The weight of this specimen was estimated to be 838 kg (1,847 lb), making it one of the largest crocodiles ever to be captured and released alive. The bulk and mass of individual crocodiles can be fairly variable, some animals being relatively slender, while others being very robust; females are often bulkier than males of a similar length. As an example of the body mass increase undergone by mature crocodiles, one of the larger crocodiles handled firsthand by Cott (1961) was 4.4 m (14 ft 5 in) and weighed 414.5 kg (914 lb), while the largest specimen measured by Graham and Beard (1973) was 4.8 m (15 ft 9 in) and weighed more than 680 kg (1,500 lb). One of the largest known specimens from South Africa, caught by J. G. Kuhlmann in Venda, which was 5.5 m (18 ft 1 in) long weighed 905.7 kg (1,997 lb).

In attempts to parse the mean male and female lengths across the species, the mean adult length was estimated to be reportedly 4 m (13 ft 1 in) in males, at which males would average about 280 kg (620 lb) in weight, while that of the female is 3.05 m (10 ft 0 in), at which females would average about 116 kg (256 lb). This gives the Nile crocodile somewhat of a size advantage over the next largest non-marine predator on the African continent, the lion (Panthera leo), which averages 188 kg (414 lb) in males and 124 kg (273 lb) in females, and attains a maximum known weight of 313 kg (690 lb), far less than that of large male crocodiles.

Nile crocodiles from cooler climates, like the southern tip of Africa, may be smaller, reaching maximum lengths of only 4 m (13 ft 1 in). A crocodile population from Mali, the Sahara Desert, and elsewhere in West Africa reaches only 2 to 3 m (6 ft 7 in to 9 ft 10 in) in length, but it is now largely recognized as a separate species, the West African crocodile.

== Distribution and habitat ==
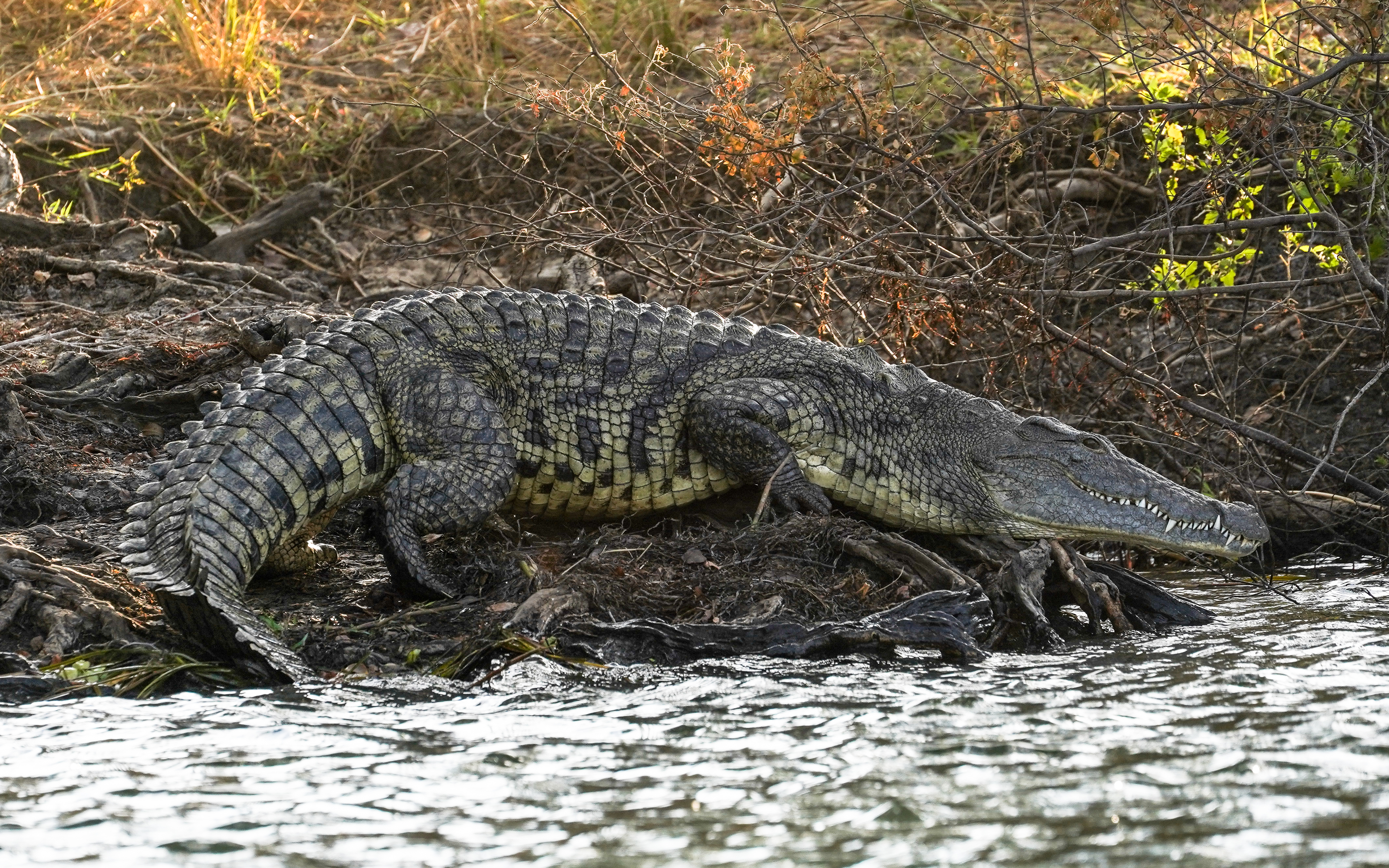
Open savanna on the bank of the Kafue River, Zambia

The Nile crocodile's current distribution extends from the regional tributaries of the Nile in Sudan and Lake Nasser in Egypt to the Cunene River in Angola, the Okavango Delta of Botswana, and the Olifants River in South Africa. It is the most common crocodilian in Africa and occurs in Somalia, Ethiopia, Uganda, Kenya, Central African Republic, the Democratic Republic of the Congo, Equatorial Guinea, Tanzania, Rwanda, Burundi, Zambia, Zimbabwe, Gabon, Malawi, Mozambique, Namibia, Sudan, South Sudan and Cameroon. Its historic range extended to the Mediterranean coast in Libya, Tunisia, Algeria, Morocco and across the Red Sea in the Palestine region and Syria. Herodotus sighted it in Lake Moeris in Egypt. It has rarely been spotted in Zanzibar and the Comoros.

An isolated population also exists in western and southern Madagascar from Sambirano River to Tôlanaro. It likely colonized the island after the extinction of the endemic crocodile Voay within the last 2000 years. In 2022, a skull of Crocodylus from Madagascar was found to be around 7,500 years old based on radiocarbon dating, suggesting that the extinction of Voay post-dates the arrival of Nile crocodiles on Madagascar.

The Nile crocodile was previously thought to also occur in West and Central Africa, but these populations are now typically recognized as a distinct species, the West African (or desert) crocodile. The West African crocodile occurs throughout much of West and Central Africa, ranging east to South Sudan and Uganda where it may come into contact with the Nile crocodile. The Nile crocodile is absent from most of West and Central Africa, but range into the latter region in eastern and southern Democratic Republic of Congo, and along the Central African coastal Atlantic region north to Cameroon. Likely a level of habitat segregation occurs between the two species, but this remains to be confirmed.

Nile crocodiles may be able to tolerate an extremely broad range of habitat types, including small brackish streams, fast-flowing rivers, swamps, dams, and tidal lakes and estuaries. In East Africa, they are found mostly in rivers, lakes, marshes, and dams, favoring open, broad bodies of water over smaller ones. They are often found in waters adjacent to various open habitats such as savanna or even semi-desert but can also acclimate to well-wooded swamps, extensively wooded riparian zones, waterways of other woodlands and the perimeter of forests. In Madagascar, the remnant population of Nile crocodiles has adapted to living within caves. Nile crocodiles may make use of ephemeral watering holes on occasion. The Nile crocodile possesses salt glands like all true crocodiles and does on occasion enter coastal and even marine waters. They have been known to enter the sea in some areas, with one specimen having been recorded 11 km (6.8 mi) off St. Lucia Bay in 1917.

=== Invasive potential ===
Nile crocodiles have been captured in South Florida in 2016, though no signs that the population is reproducing in the wild have been found. Genetic studies of Nile crocodiles captured in the wild in Florida revealed that they are all closely related to each other, suggesting a single source of the introduction. This source remains unclear, as their genetics do not match samples collected from captives at various zoos and theme parks in Florida. When compared to Nile crocodiles from Africa, the Florida wild specimens are most closely related to South African Nile crocodiles. It is unknown how many Nile crocodiles are present in Florida.

== Behaviour ==
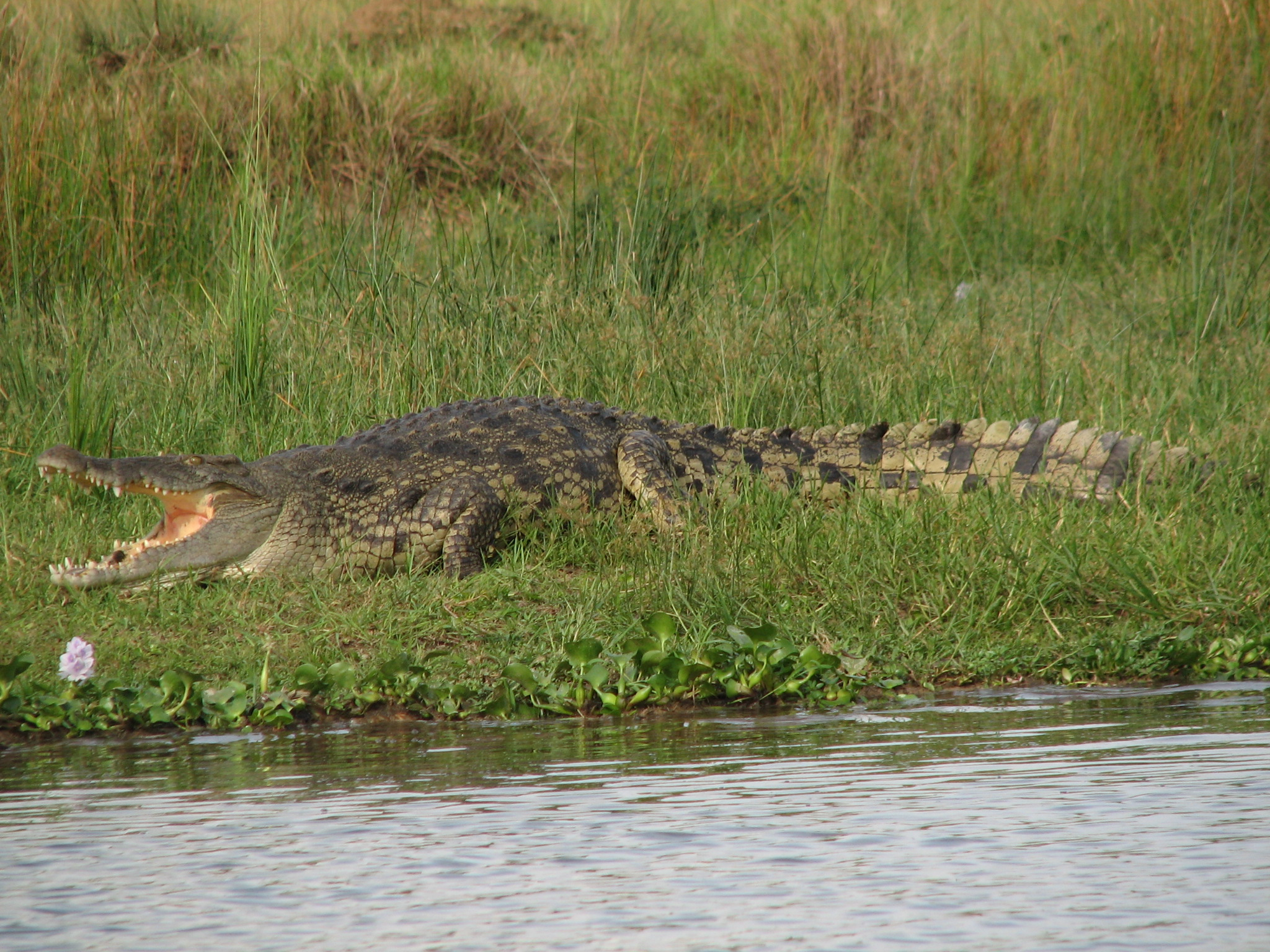
Adult Nile crocodile basking at Victoria Nile of Murchison Falls National Park, Uganda

Generally, Nile crocodiles are relatively inert creatures, as are most crocodilians and other large, cold-blooded creatures. More than half of the crocodiles observed by Cott (1961), if not disturbed, spent the hours from 9:00 a.m. to 4:00 p.m. continuously basking with their jaws open if conditions were sunny. If their jaws are bound together in the extreme midday heat, Nile crocodiles may easily die from overheating. Although they can remain practically motionless for hours on end, whether basking or sitting in shallows, Nile crocodiles are said to be constantly aware of their surroundings and aware of the presence of other animals. However, mouth-gaping (while essential to thermoregulation) may also serve as a threat display to other crocodiles. For example, some specimens have been observed mouth-gaping at night, when overheating is not a risk. In Lake Turkana, crocodiles rarely bask at all through the day, unlike crocodiles from most other areas, for unknown reasons, usually sitting motionless partially exposed at the surface in shallows, with no apparent ill effects from the lack of basking on land.

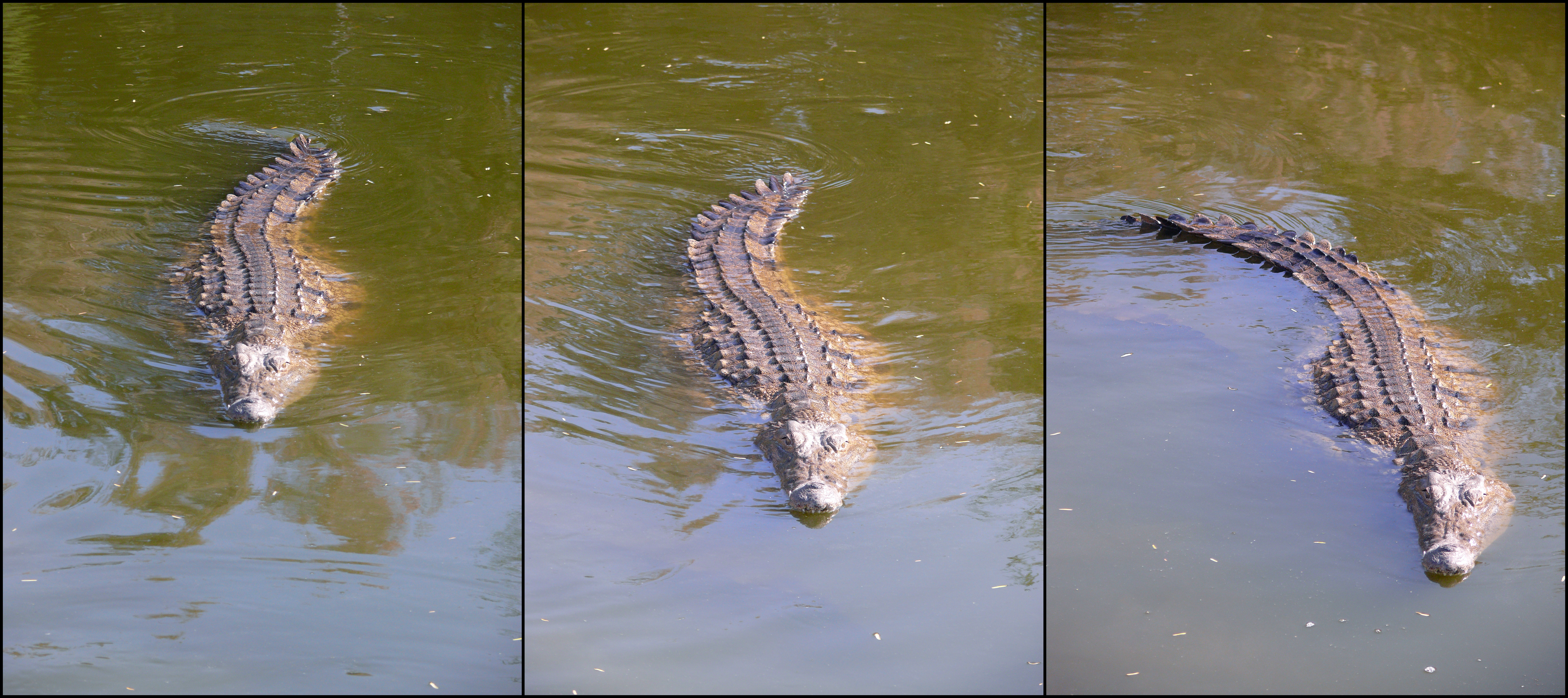
Crocodiles are deft and agile swimmers when motivated.

In South Africa, Nile crocodiles are more easily observed in winter because of the extensive amount of time they spend basking at this time of year. More time is spent in water on overcast, rainy, or misty days. In the southern reaches of their range, as a response to dry, cool conditions that they cannot survive externally, crocodiles may dig and take refuge in tunnels and engage in aestivation. Pooley found in Royal Natal National Park that during aestivation, young crocodiles of 60 to 90 cm (24 to 35 in) total length would dig tunnels around 1.2 to 1.8 m (3 ft 11 in to 5 ft 11 in) in depth for most, with some tunnels measuring more than 2.7 m (8 ft 10 in), the longest there being 3.65 m (12 ft 0 in). Crocodiles in aestivation are lethargic, entering a state similar to animals that hibernate. Only the largest individuals engaging in aestivation leave the burrow to sun on the warmest days; otherwise, these crocodiles rarely left their burrows. Aestivation has been recorded from May to August.

Nile crocodiles usually dive for only a few minutes at a time, but can swim under water up to 30 minutes if threatened. If they remain fully inactive, they can hold their breath for up to 2 hours (which, as aforementioned, is due to the high levels of lactic acid in their blood). They have a rich vocal range and good hearing. Nile crocodiles normally crawl along on their bellies, but they can also "high walk" with their trunks raised above the ground. Smaller specimens can gallop, and even larger individuals are capable of occasional, surprising bursts of speed, briefly reaching up to 14 km/h (8.7 mph). They can swim much faster, moving their bodies and tails in a sinuous fashion, and they can sustain this form of movement much longer than on land, with a maximum known swimming speed of 30 to 35 km/h (19 to 22 mph).

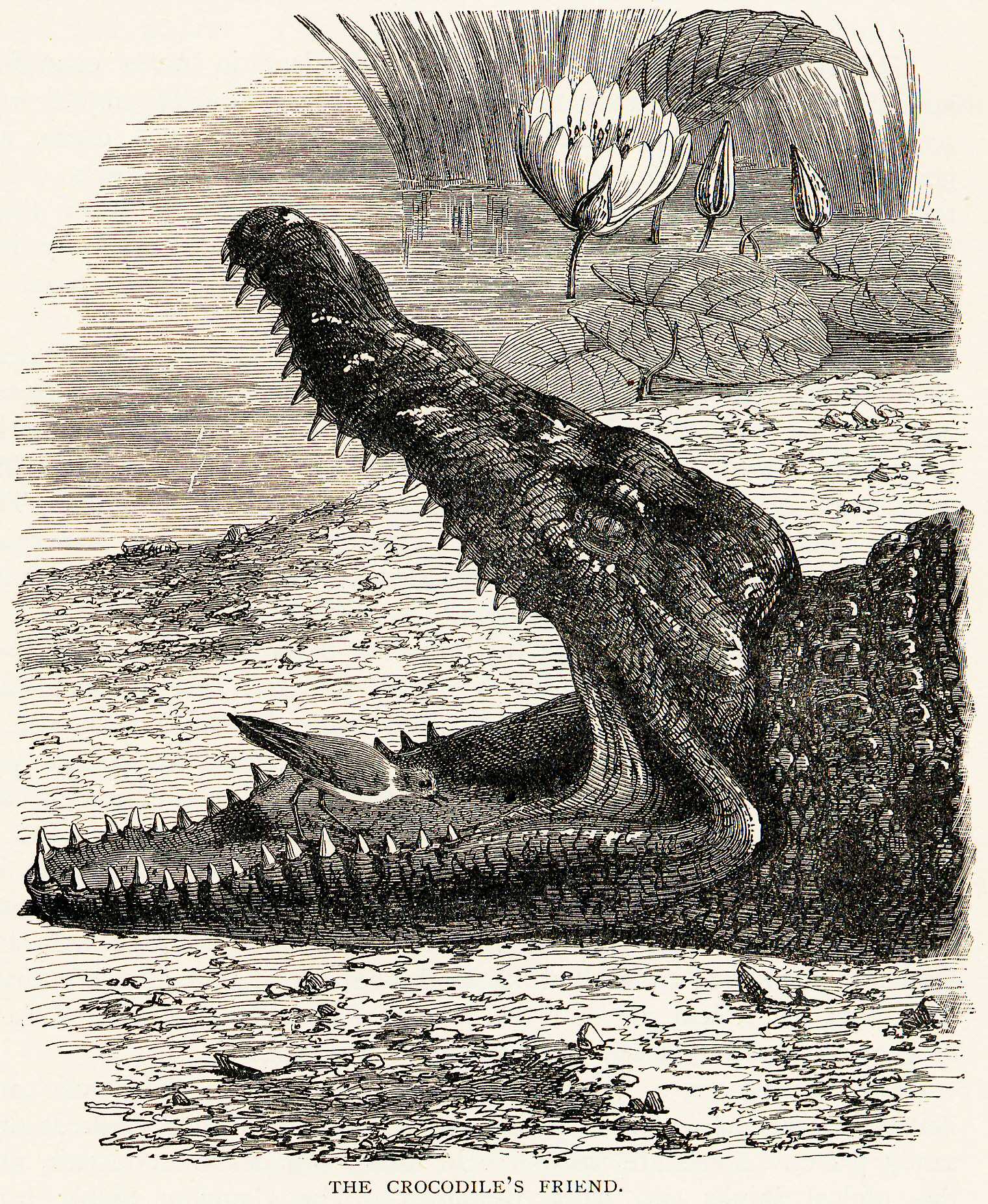
Drawing depicting the relationship between the trochilus bird and the crocodile.

Nile crocodiles have been widely known to have gastroliths in their stomachs, which are stones swallowed by animals for various purposes. Although this is clearly a deliberate behaviour for the species, the purpose is not definitively known. Gastroliths are not present in hatchlings, but increase quickly in presence within most crocodiles examined at 2–3.1 m (6 ft 7 in – 10 ft 2 in) and yet normally become extremely rare again in very large specimens, meaning that some animals may eventually expel them. However, large specimens can have a large number of gastroliths. One crocodile measuring 3.84 m (12 ft 7 in) and weighing 239 kg (527 lb) had 5.1 kg (11 lb) of stones in its stomach, perhaps a record gastrolith weight for a crocodile. Specimens shot near Mpondwe on the Semliki River had gastroliths in their stomach despite being shot miles away from any sources for the stones; the same holds true for specimens from Kafue Flats, Upper Zambezi and Bangweulu Swamp, all of which often had stones inside them despite being nowhere near stony regions. Cott (1961) felt that gastroliths were most likely serving as ballast to provide stability and additional weight to sink in water, this bearing great probability over the theories that they assist in digestion and staving off hunger. However, Alderton (1998) stated that a study using radiology found that gastroliths were seen to internally aid the grinding of food during digestion for a small Nile crocodile.

Herodotus claimed that Nile crocodiles have a symbiotic relationship with a bird named the Trochilus which enter the crocodile's mouth and pick leeches feeding on the crocodile's blood. Guggisberg (1972) had seen examples of birds picking scraps of meat from the teeth of basking crocodiles (without entering the mouth) and prey from soil very near basking crocodiles, so felt it was not impossible that a bold, hungry bird may occasionally nearly enter a crocodile's mouth, but not likely as a habitual behaviour. MacFarland and Reeder, reviewing the evidence in 1974, found that: "Extensive observations of Nile crocodiles in regular or occasional association with various species of potential cleaners (e.g. Plovers, Sandpipers, water dikkop) ... have resulted in only a few reports of sandpipers removing leeches from the mouth and gular scutes and snapping at insects along the reptile's body."

== Hunting and diet ==
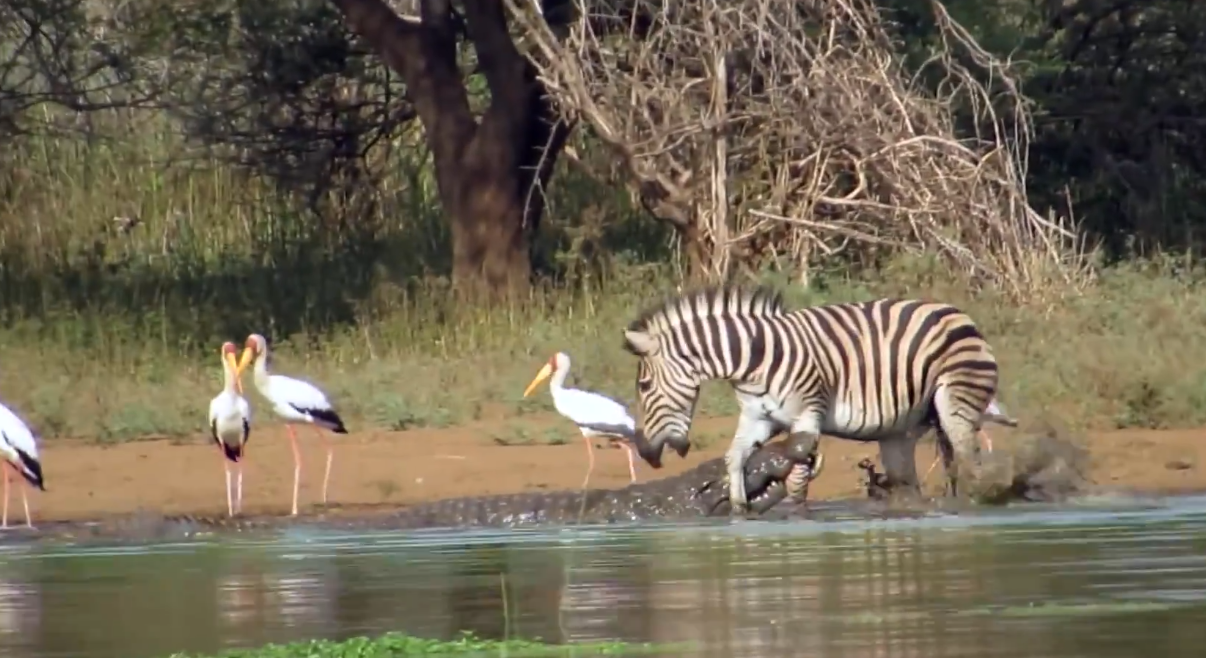
A Nile crocodile attacking a Burchell's zebra in Kruger National Park, South Africa

Nile crocodiles are apex predators throughout their range. In the water, this species is an agile and rapid hunter relying on both movement and pressure sensors to catch any prey unfortunate enough to present itself inside or near the waterfront. Out of water, however, the Nile crocodile can only rely on its limbs, as it gallops on solid ground, to chase prey. No matter where they attack prey, this and other crocodilians take practically all of their food by ambush, needing to grab their prey in a matter of seconds to succeed. They have an ectothermic metabolism, so can survive for long periods between meals. However, for such large animals, their stomachs are relatively small, not much larger than a basketball in an average-sized adult, so as a rule, they are anything but voracious eaters. Young crocodiles feed more actively than their elders, according to studies in Uganda and Zambia. In general, at the smallest sizes (0.3–1 m (1 ft 0 in – 3 ft 3 in)), Nile crocodiles were most likely to have full stomachs (17.4% full per Cott); adults at 3–4 m (9 ft 10 in – 13 ft 1 in) in length were most likely to have empty stomachs (20.2%). In the largest size range studied by Cott, 4–5 m (13 ft 1 in – 16 ft 5 in), they were the second most likely to either have full stomachs (10%) or empty stomachs (20%). Other studies have also shown a large number of adult Nile crocodiles with empty stomachs. For example, in Lake Turkana, Kenya, 48.4% of crocodiles had empty stomachs. The stomachs of brooding females are always empty, meaning that they can survive several months without food.

The Nile crocodile mostly hunts within the confines of waterways, attacking aquatic prey or terrestrial animals when they come to the water to drink or to cross. The crocodile mainly hunts land animals by almost fully submerging its body under water. Occasionally, a crocodile quietly surfaces so that only its eyes (to check positioning) and nostrils are visible, and swims quietly and stealthily toward its mark. The attack is sudden and unpredictable. The crocodile lunges its body out of water and grasps its prey. On other occasions, more of its head and upper body is visible, especially when the terrestrial prey animal is on higher ground, to get a sense of the direction of the prey item at the top of an embankment or on a tree branch. Crocodile teeth are not used for tearing up flesh, but to sink deep into it and hold on to the prey item. The immense bite force, which may be as high as 5,000 lbf (22,000 N) in large adults, ensures that the prey item cannot escape the grip. Prey taken is often much smaller than the crocodile itself, and such prey can be overpowered and swallowed with ease. When it comes to larger prey, success depends on the crocodile's body power and weight to pull the prey item back into the water, where it is either drowned or killed by sudden thrashes of the head or by tearing it into pieces with the help of other crocodiles.

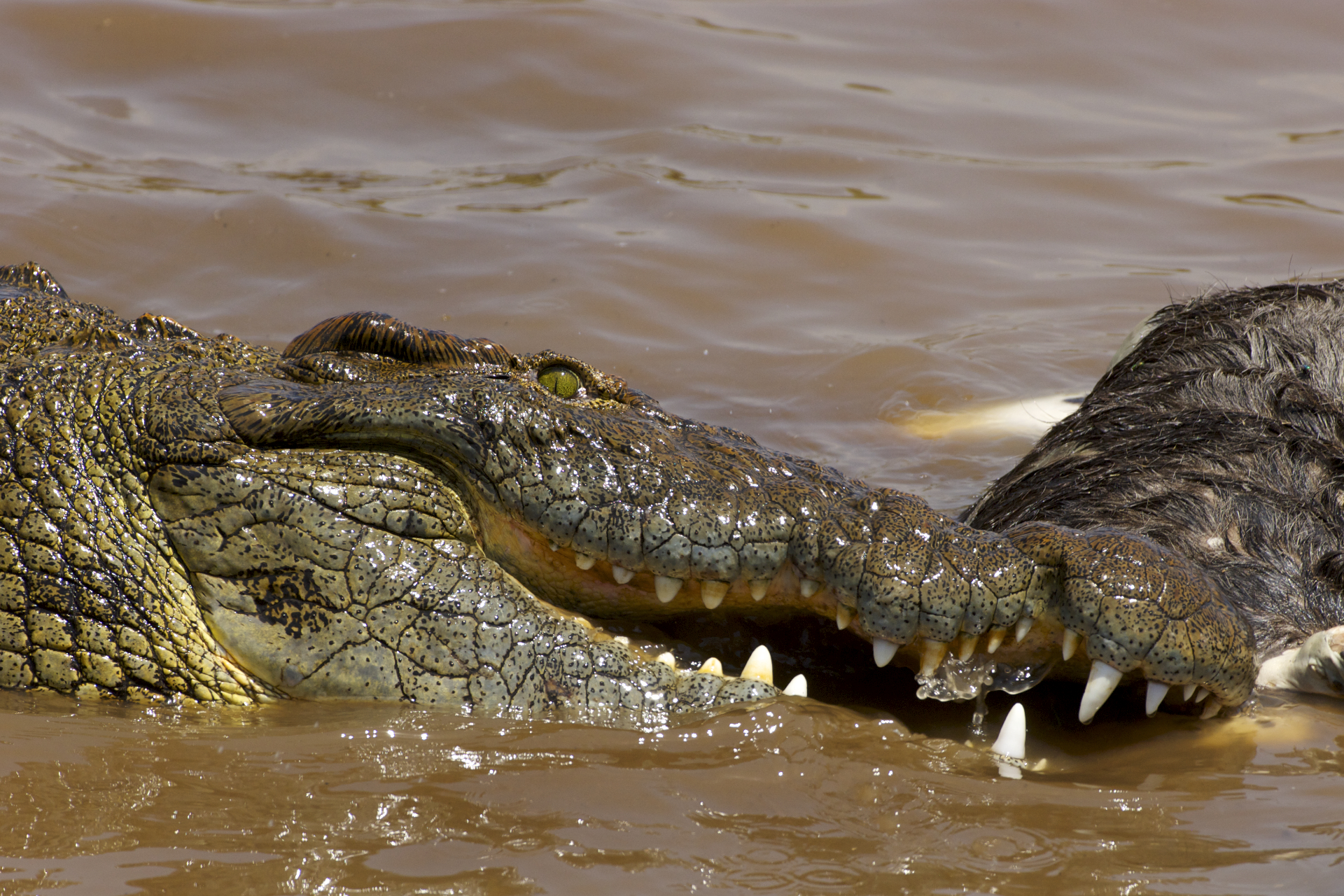
Feeding on a dead wildebeest in the Masai Mara

Subadult and smaller adult Nile crocodiles use their bodies and tails to herd groups of fish toward a bank, and eat them with quick sideways jerks of their heads. Some crocodiles of the species may habitually use their tails to sweep terrestrial prey off balance, sometimes forcing the prey specimen into the water, where it can be more easily drowned. They also cooperate, blocking migrating fish by forming a semicircle across the river. The most dominant crocodile eats first. Their ability to lie concealed with most of their bodies under water, combined with their speed over short distances, makes them effective opportunistic hunters of larger prey. They grab such prey in their powerful jaws, drag it into the water, and hold it underneath until it drowns. They also scavenge or steal kills from other predators, such as lions and leopards (Panthera pardus). Groups of Nile crocodiles may travel hundreds of meters from a waterway to feast on a carcass. They also feed on dead hippopotamuses (Hippopotamus amphibius) as a group (sometimes including three or four dozen crocodiles), tolerating each other. Much of the food from crocodile stomachs may come from scavenging carrion, and the crocodiles could be viewed as performing a similar function at times as do vultures or hyenas on land. Once their prey is dead, they rip off and swallow chunks of flesh. When groups are sharing a kill, they use each other for leverage, biting down hard and then twisting their bodies to tear off large pieces of meat in a "death roll". They may also get the necessary leverage by lodging their prey under branches or stones, before rolling and ripping.

The Nile crocodile possesses unique predation behavior characterized by the ability of preying both within water, where it is best adapted, and out of it, which often results in unpredictable attacks on almost any other animal up to twice its size. Most hunting on land is done at night by lying in ambush near forest trails or roadsides, up to 50 m (170 ft) from the water's edge. Since their speed and agility on land is rather outmatched by most terrestrial animals, they must use obscuring vegetation or terrain to have a chance of succeeding during land-based hunts. In one case, an adult crocodile charged from the water up a bank to kill a bushbuck (Tragelaphus scriptus) and instead of dragging it into the water, was observed to pull the kill further on land into the cover of the bush. Two subadult crocodiles were once seen carrying the carcass of a nyala (Tragelaphus angasii) across land in unison. In South Africa, a game warden far from water sources in a savannah-scrub area reported that he saw a crocodile jump up and grab a donkey by the neck and then drag the prey off. Small carnivores are readily taken opportunistically, including African clawless otters (Aonyx capensis).

=== Interspecific predatory relationships ===
Living in the rich biosphere of Africa south of the Sahara, the Nile crocodile may come into contact with other large predators. Its place in the ecosystems it inhabits is unique, as it is the only large tetrapod carnivore that spends the majority of its life in water and hunting prey associated with aquatic zones. Large mammalian predators in Africa are often social animals and obligated to feed almost exclusively on land. The Nile crocodile is a strong example of an apex predator. Outside water, crocodiles can meet competition from other dominant savannah predators, notably big cats, which in Africa are represented by lions, cheetahs, and leopards. In general, big cats and crocodiles have a relationship of mutual avoidance. Occasionally, if regular food becomes scarce, both lions and the crocodile will steal kills on land from each other and, depending on size, will be dominant over one another. Both species may be attracted to carrion, and may occasionally fight over both kills or carrion. Most conflicts over food occur near the water and can literally lead to a tug-of-war over a carcass that can end either way, although seldom is there any serious fighting or bloodshed between the large carnivores. Intimidation displays may also resolve these conflicts. However, when size differences are prominent, the predators may prey on each other.

== Reproduction ==
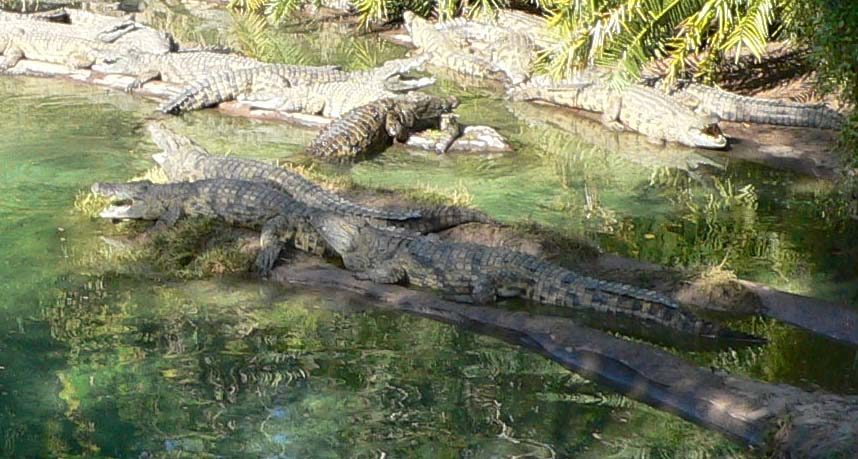
A float of Nile crocodiles in Kilimanjaro Safaris at Disney's Animal Kingdom

On average, sexual maturity is obtained from 12 to 16 years of age. For males, the onset of sexual maturity occurs when they are about 3.3 m (10 ft 10 in) long and mass of 155 kg (342 lb), being fairly consistent. On the other hand, that for females is rather more variable, and may be indicative of the health of a regional population based on size at sexual maturity. On average, according to Cott (1961), female sexual maturity occurs when they reach 2.2 to 3 m (7 ft 3 in to 9 ft 10 in) in length. Similarly, a wide range of studies from southern Africa found that the average length for females at the onset of sexual maturity was 2.33 m (7 ft 8 in). However, stunted sexual maturity appears to occur in populations at opposite extremes, both where crocodiles are thought to be overpopulated and where they are overly reduced to heavy hunting, sometimes with females laying eggs when they measure as small as 1.5 m (4 ft 11 in) although it is questionable whether such clutches would bear healthy hatchlings.

According to Bourquin (2008), the average breeding female in southern Africa is between 3 and 3.6 m (9 ft 10 in and 11 ft 10 in). Earlier studies support that breeding is often inconsistent in females less than 3 m (9 ft 10 in) and clutch size is smaller, a female at 2.75 m (9 ft 0 in) reportedly never lays more than 35 eggs, while a female measuring 3.64 m (11 ft 11 in) can expect a clutch of up to 95 eggs. In "stunted" newly mature females from Lake Turkana measuring 1.83 m (6 ft 0 in), the average clutch size was only 15. Graham and Beard (1968) hypothesized that, while females do continue to grow as do males throughout life, that past a certain age and size that females much over 3.2 m (10 ft 6 in) in length in Lake Turkana no longer breed (supported by the physiology of the females examined here); however, subsequent studies in Botswana and South Africa have found evidence of nesting females at least 4.1 m (13 ft 5 in) in length. In the Olifants River in South Africa, rainfall influenced the size of nesting females as only larger females (greater than 3 m (9 ft 10 in)) nested during the driest years. Breeding females along the Olifants were overall larger than those in Zimbabwe. Most females nest only every two to three years while mature males may breed every year.

During the mating season, males attract females by bellowing, slapping their snouts in the water, blowing water out of their noses, and making a variety of other noises. Among the larger males of a population, territorial clashes can lead to physical fighting between males especially if they are near the same size. Such clashes can be brutal affairs and can end in mortality but typically end with victor and loser still alive, the latter withdrawing into deep waters. Once a female has been attracted, the pair warble and rub the undersides of their jaws together. Compared to the tender behaviour of the female accepting the male, copulation is rather rough (even described as "rape"-like by Graham & Beard (1968)) in which the male often roars and pins the female underwater. Cott noted little detectable discrepancy in the mating habits of Nile crocodiles and American alligators. In some regions, males have reportedly mated with several females, perhaps any female that enters his claimed territory, though in most regions annual monogamy appears to be most common in this species.

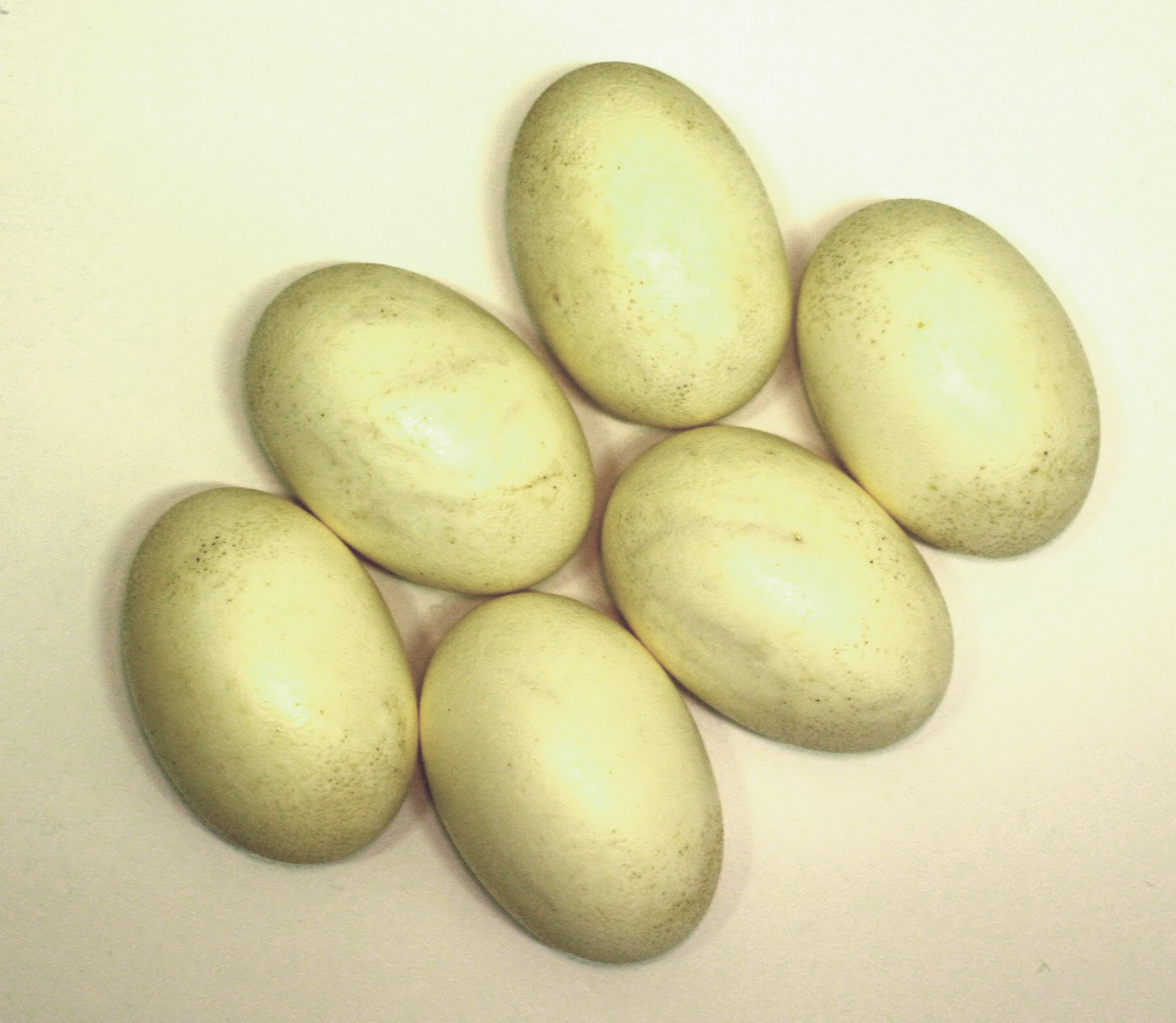
Eggs

Females lay their eggs about one to two months after mating. The nesting season can fall in nearly every month of the year. In the northern extremes of the distribution (i.e. Somalia or Egypt), the nesting season is December through February while in the southern limits (i.e. South Africa or Tanzania) is in August through December. In crocodiles between these distributions egg-laying is in intermediate months, often focused between April and July. The dates correspond to about a month or two into the dry season within that given region. The benefits of this are presumably that nest flooding risk is considerably reduced at this time and the stage at which hatchlings begin their lives out of the egg falls roughly at the beginning of the rainy season, when water levels are still relatively low but insect prey is in recovery. Preferred nesting locations are sandy shores, dry stream beds, or riverbanks. The female digs a hole a few metres from the bank and up to 0.5 m (20 in) deep, and lays on average between 25 and 80 eggs. The number of eggs varies and depends partially on the size of the female. The most significant prerequisites to a nesting site are soil with the depth to permit the female to dig out the nest mound, shading to which mother can retire during the heat of the day and access to water. She finds a spot soft enough to allow her to dig a sideways slanted burrow. The mother Nile crocodile deposits the eggs in the terminal chamber and packs the sand or earth back over the nest pit. While, like all crocodilians, the Nile crocodile digs out a hole for a nest site, unlike most other modern crocodilians, female Nile crocodiles bury their eggs in sand or soil rather than incubate them in rotting vegetation. The female may urinate sporadically on the soil to keep it moist, which prevents soil from hardening excessively. After burying the eggs, the female then guards them for the three-month incubation period. Nests have been recorded seldom in concealed positions such as under a bush or in grasses, but normally in open spots on the bank. It is thought the Nile crocodile cannot nest under heavy forest cover as can two of the three other African crocodiles because they do not use rotting leaves (a very effective method of producing heat for the eggs) and thus require sunlight on sand or soil the surface of the egg chamber to provide the appropriate warmth for embryo development. In South Africa, the invasive plant Chromolaena odorata has recently exploded along banks traditionally used by crocodiles as nesting sites and caused nest failures by blocking sunlight over the nest chamber.

When Nile crocodiles have been entirely free from disturbance in the past, they may nest gregariously with the nest lying so close together that after hatching time the rims of craters are almost contiguous. These communal nesting sites are not known to exist today, perhaps being most recently recorded at Ntoroko peninsula, Uganda where two such sites remaining until 1952. In one area, 17 craters were found in an area of 25 yd × 22 yd (75 ft × 66 ft), in another 24 in an area of 26 yd × 24 yd (78 ft × 72 ft). Communal nesting areas also reported from Lake Victoria (up until the 1930s) and also in the 20th century at Rahad River, Lake Turkana and Malawi. The behaviour of the female Nile crocodile is considered unpredictable and may be driven by the regional extent of prior human disturbance and human persecution rather than natural variability. In some areas, the mother crocodiles will only leave the nest if she needs to cool off (thermoregulation) by taking a quick dip or seeking out a patch of shade. Females will not leave nest site even if rocks are thrown at her back and several authors note her trance-like state while standing near nest, similar to that of crocodiles in aestivation but not like any other stage in their life-cycle. In such a trance, some mother Nile crocodiles may show no discernable reaction even if pelted with stones. At other times, the female will fiercely attack anything approaching their eggs, sometimes joined by another crocodile which may be the sire of the young. In other areas, the nesting female may disappear upon potential disturbance which may allow the presence of both the female and her buried nest to escape unwanted detection by predators. Despite the attentive care of both parents, the nests are often raided by humans and monitor lizards or other animals while she is temporarily absent.

3D model of the head of a Nile crocodile embryo.

At a reported incubation period of about 90 days, the stage is notably shorter than that of the American alligator (110–120 days) but slightly longer than that of the mugger crocodile. Nile crocodiles have temperature-dependent sex determination (TSD), which means the sex of their hatchlings is determined not by genetics as is the case in mammals and birds, but by the average temperature during the middle third of their incubation period. If the temperature inside the nest is below 31.7 °C (89.1 °F), or above 34.5 °C (94.1 °F), the offspring will be female. Males can only be born if the temperature is within that narrow range. The hatchlings start to make a high-pitched chirping noise before hatching, which is the signal for the mother to rip open the nest. It is thought to be either difficult or impossible for hatchlings to escape the nest burrow without assistance, as the surface may become very heavy and packed above them. The mother crocodile may pick up the eggs in her mouth, and roll them between their tongue and the upper palate to help crack the shell and release her offspring. Once the eggs hatch, the female may lead the hatchlings to water, or even carry them there in her mouth, as female American alligators have been observed doing.

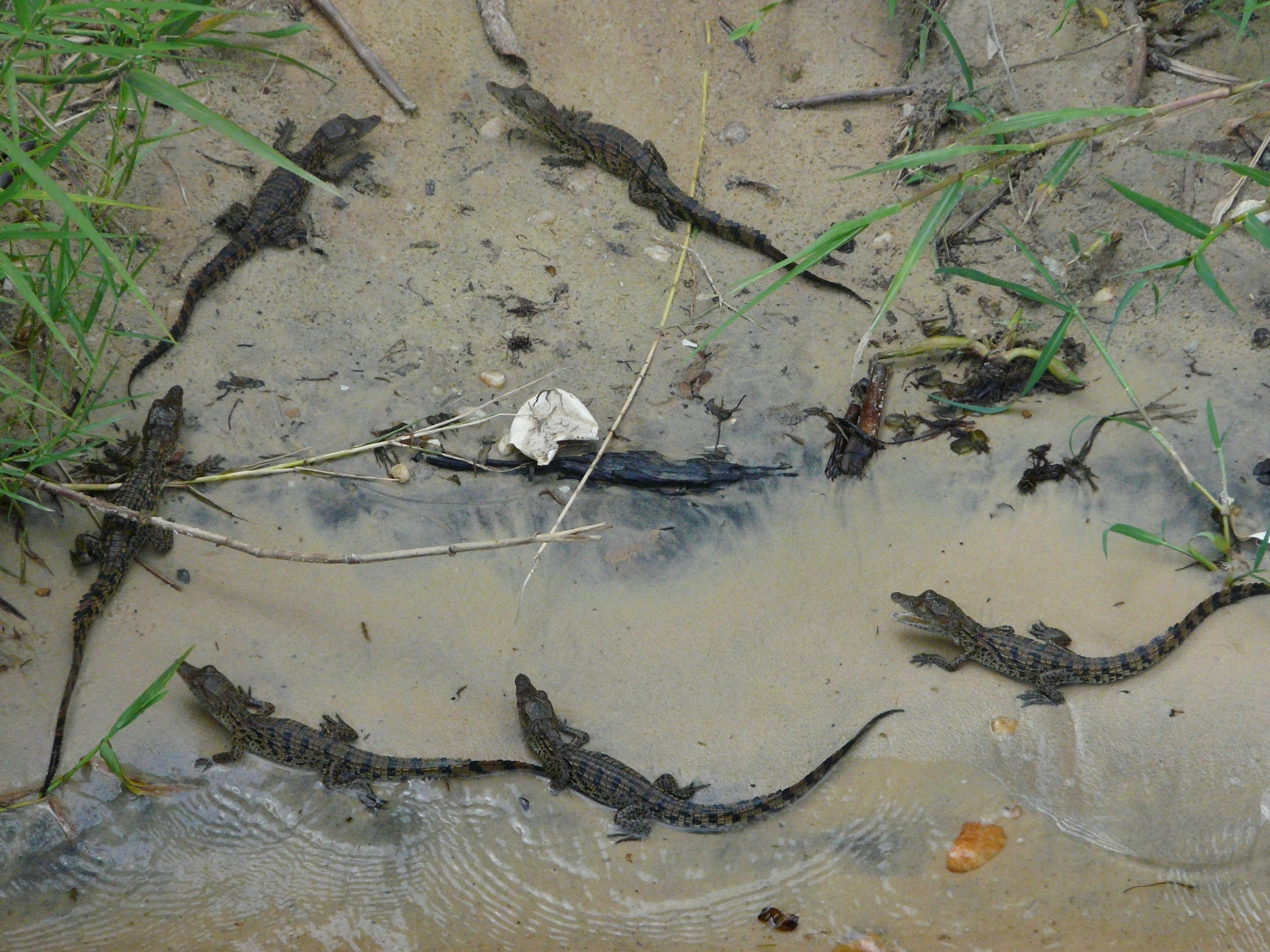
A grouping of yearling baby Nile crocodiles

Hatchling Nile crocodiles are between 280 and 300 mm (11 and 12 in) long at first and weigh around 70 g (2.5 oz). The hatchlings grow approximately that length each year for the first several years. The new mother will protect her offspring for up to two years, and if there are multiple nests in the same area, the mothers may form a crèche. During this time, the mothers may pick up their offspring either in their mouths or gular fold (throat pouch) to keep the babies safe. The mother will sometimes carry her young on her back to avoid natural predators of the small crocodiles, which can be surprisingly bold even with the mother around. Nile crocodiles of under two years are much more rarely observed than larger specimens, and more seldom seen than the same age young in several other types of crocodilian. Young crocodiles are shy and evasive due to the formidable array of predators that they must face in sub-Saharan Africa, spending little time sunning and moving about nocturnally whenever possible. Crocodiles two years old and younger may spend a surprising amount of time on land, as evidenced by the range of terrestrial insects found in their stomachs, and their lifestyle may resemble that of a semi-aquatic mid-sized lizard more so than the very aquatic lives of older crocodiles. At the end of the two years, the hatchlings will be about 1.2 m (3 ft 11 in) long, and will naturally depart the nest area, avoiding the territories of older and larger crocodiles. After this stage, crocodiles may loosely associate with similarly sized crocodiles and many enter feeding congregations of crocodiles once they attain 2 m (6 ft 7 in), at which size predators and cannibal crocodiles become much less of a concern. Crocodile longevity is not well established, but larger species like the Nile crocodile live longer, and may have a potential maximum life span of 70 to 100 years, though no crocodilian species commonly exceeds a lifespan of 50 to 60 years in captivity.

=== Natural mortality of young Nile crocodiles ===
An estimated 10% of eggs will survive to hatch and a mere 1% of young that hatch will successfully reach adulthood. The full range of causes for mortality of young Nile crocodiles is not well understood, as very young and small Nile crocodiles or well-concealed nests are only sporadically observed. Unseasonable flooding (during nesting which corresponds with the regional dry season) is not uncommon and has probably destroyed several nests, although statistical likelihood of such an event is not known. The only aspect of mortality in this age range that is well studied is predation and this is most likely the primary cause of death while the saurians are still diminutive. The single most virulent predator of nests is almost certainly the Nile monitor. This predator can destroy about 50% of studied Nile crocodile eggs on its own, often being successful (as are other nest predators) in light of the trance-like state that the mother crocodile enters while brooding or taking advantage of moments where she is distracted or needs to leave the nest. In comparison, perenties (Varanus giganteus) (the Australian ecological equivalent of the Nile monitor) succeeds in depredating about 90% of freshwater crocodile (Crocodylus johnsoni) eggs and about 25% of saltwater crocodile nests. Mammalian predators can take nearly as heavy of a toll, especially large mongooses such the Egyptian mongoose (Herpestes ichneumon) in the north and the water mongoose in the south of crocodile's range. Opportunistic mammals who attack Nile crocodile nests have included wild pigs, medium-sized wild cats and baboon troops. Like Nile monitors, mammalian predators probably locate crocodile nests by scent as the padded-down mound is easy to miss visually. Marabou storks sometimes follow monitors to pirate crocodile eggs for themselves to consume, although can also dig out nests on their own with their massive, awl-like bills if they can visually discern the nest mound.

Predators of Nile crocodiles eggs have ranged from insects such as the red flour beetle (Tribolium castaneum) to predators as large and formidable as spotted hyenas (Crocuta crocuta). Unsurprisingly, once exposed to the elements as hatchlings, the young, small Nile crocodiles are even more vulnerable. Most of the predators of eggs also opportunistically eat young crocodiles, including monitors and marabous, plus almost all co-existing raptorial birds, including vultures, eagles, and large owls and buzzards. Many "large waders" are virulent predators of crocodile hatchlings, from dainty little egrets (Egretta garzetta) and compact hamerkops (Scopus umbretta) to towering saddle-billed storks (Ephippiorhynchus senegalensis), goliath herons and shoebills (Balaeniceps rex). Larger corvids and some non-wading water birds (i.e. pelicans) can also take some young Nile crocodiles. Mammalian carnivores take many hatchlings as well as large turtles and Central African rock pythons, large predatory freshwater fish, such as the tigerfish, the Nile perch, and bull sharks, when they enter river systems. When crocodile nests are dug out and the young placed in water by the mother, in areas such as Royal Natal National Park predators can essentially enter a feeding frenzy. It may take a few years before predation is no longer a major cause of mortality for young crocodiles. African fish eagles can take crocodile hatchlings up to a few months of age and honey badgers can prey on yearlings. Once they reach their juvenile stage, large Southern African rock pythons and big cats remain as the only predatory threat to young crocodiles. Perhaps no predator is more deadly to young Nile crocodiles than larger crocodiles of their own species, as, like most crocodilians, they are cannibalistic. This species may be particularly dangerous to their own kind considering their aggressive dispositions. While the mother crocodile will react aggressively toward potential predators and has been recorded chasing and occasionally catching and killing such interlopers into her range, due to the sheer number of animals who feed on baby crocodiles and the large number of hatchlings, she is more often unsuccessful at deflecting such predators.

== Environmental status ==
Conservation organizations have determined that the main threats to Nile crocodiles, in turn, are loss of habitat, pollution, hunting, and human activities such as accidental entanglement in fishing nets. Though the Nile crocodile has been hunted since ancient times, the advent of the readily available firearm made it much easier to kill these potentially dangerous reptiles. The species began to be hunted on a much larger scale from the 1940s to the 1960s, primarily for high-quality leather, although also for meat with its purported curative properties. The population was severely depleted, and the species faced extinction. National laws, and international trade regulations have resulted in a resurgence in many areas, and the species as a whole is no longer wholly threatened with extinction. The status of Nile crocodiles was variable based on the regional prosperity and extent of conserved wetlands by the 1970s. However, as is the case for many large animal species whether they are protected or not, persecution and poaching have continued apace and between the 1950s and 1980s, an estimated 3 million Nile crocodiles were slaughtered by humans for the leather trade. In Lake Sibaya, South Africa, it was determined that in the 21st century, persecution continues as the direct cause for the inability of Nile crocodiles to recover after the leather trade last century. Recovery for the species appears quite gradual and few areas have recovered to bear crocodile populations, i.e. largely insufficient to produce sustainable populations of young crocodiles, on par with times prior to the peak of leather trading. Crocodile 'protection programs' are artificial environments where crocodiles exist safely and without the threat of extermination from hunters.

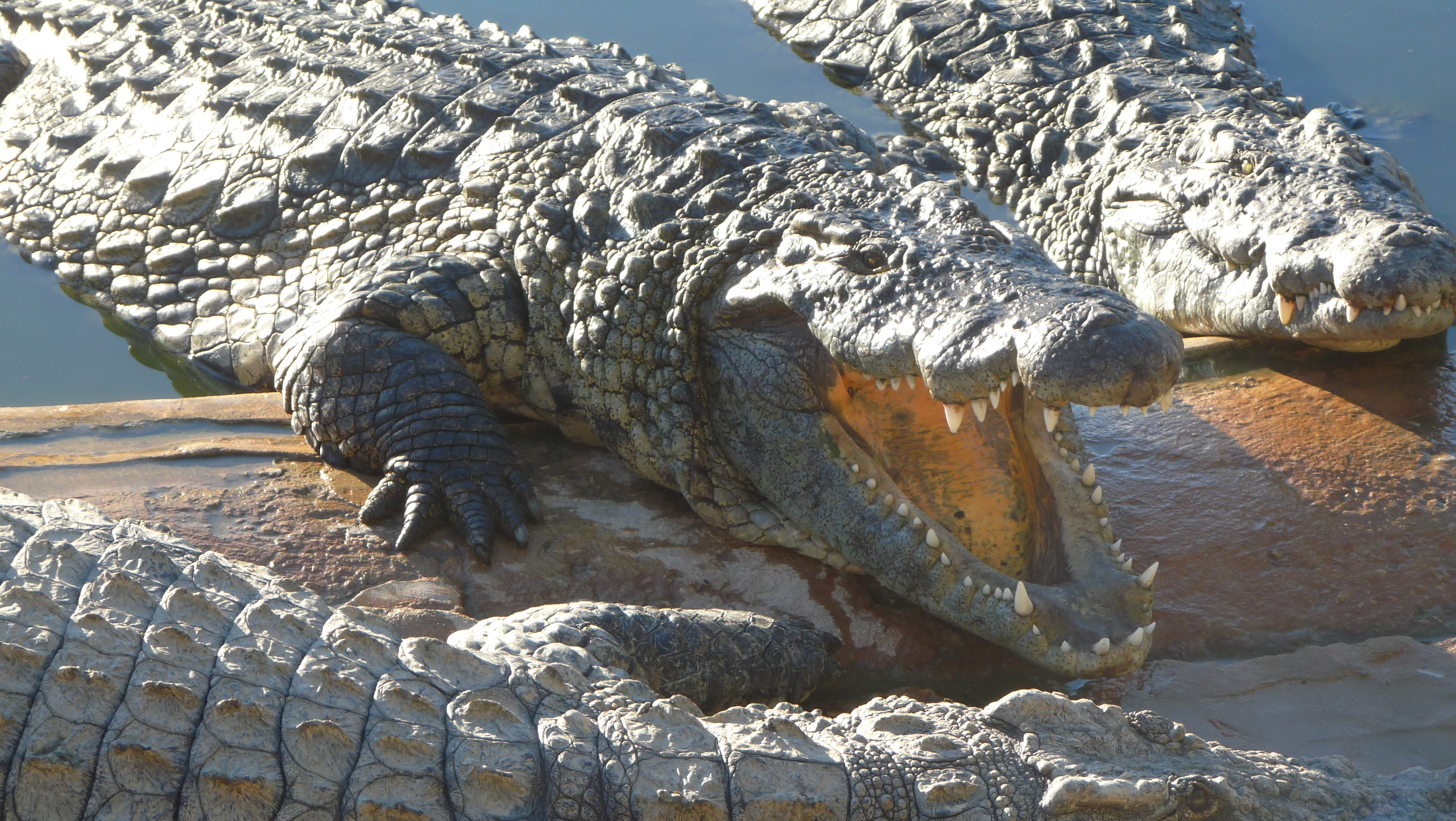
Large adults in captivity, Djerba, Tunisia

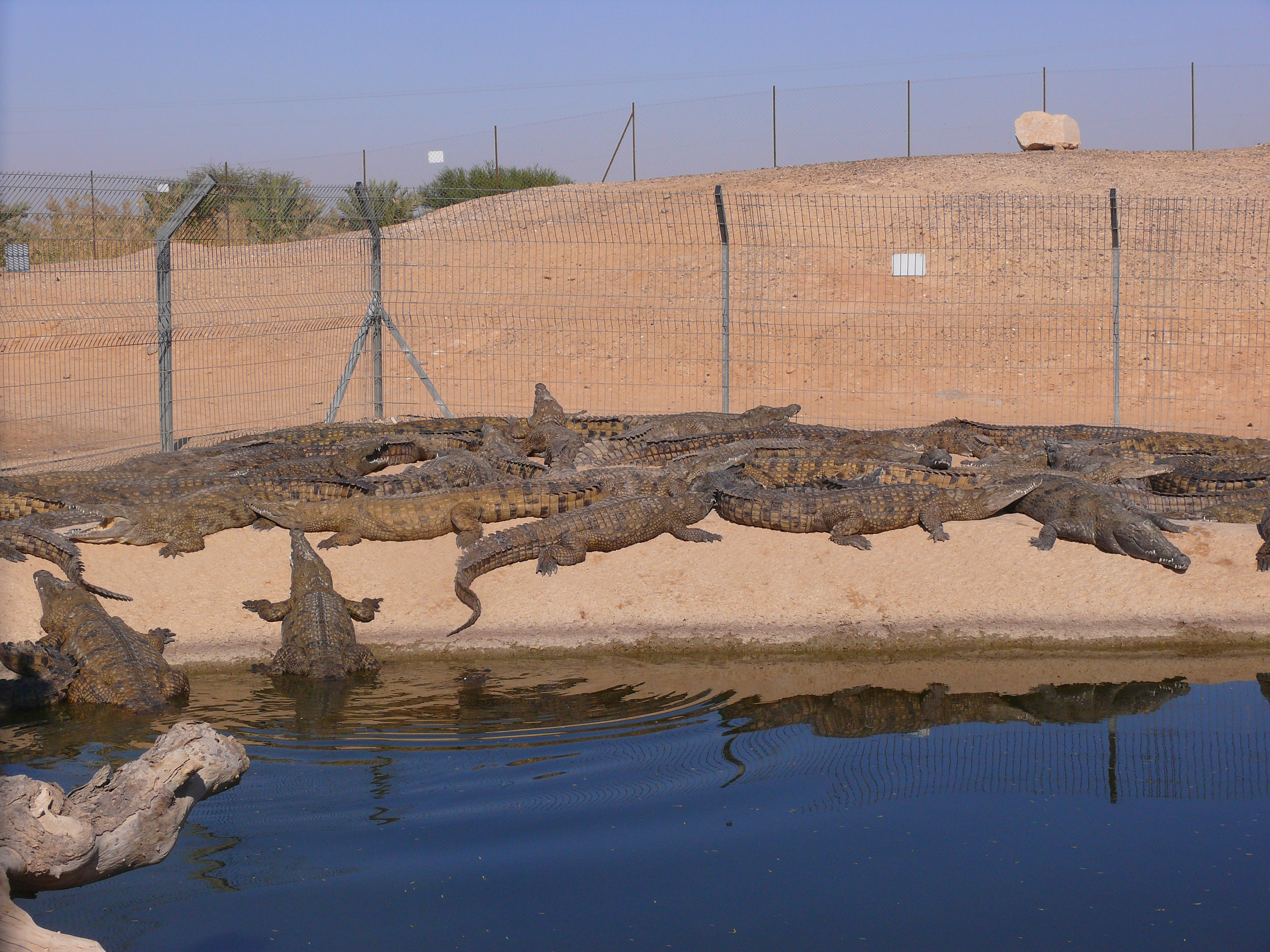
Nile crocodiles in captivity, Israel

An estimated 250,000 to 500,000 individuals occur in the wild today. The IUCN Red List assesses the Nile crocodile as "Least Concern (LR/lc)". The Convention on International Trade in Endangered Species (CITES) lists the Nile crocodile under Appendix I (threatened with extinction) in most of its range; and under Appendix II (not threatened, but trade must be controlled) in the remainder, which either allows ranching or sets an annual quota of skins taken from the wild. The Nile crocodile is widely distributed, with strong, documented populations in many countries in eastern and southern Africa, including Somalia, Ethiopia, Kenya, Zambia and Zimbabwe. This species is farmed for its meat and leather in some parts of Africa. Successful sustainable-yield programs focused on ranching crocodiles for their skins have been successfully implemented in this area, and even countries with quotas are moving toward ranching. In 1993, 80,000 Nile crocodile skins were produced, the majority from ranches in Zimbabwe and South Africa. Crocodile farming is one of the few burgeoning industries in Zimbabwe. Unlike American alligator flesh, Nile crocodile meat is generally considered unappetizing although edible as tribes such as the Turkana may opportunistically feed on them. According to Graham and Beard (1968), Nile crocodile meat has an "indescribable" and unpleasant taste, greasy texture and a "repellent" smell.

The conservation situation is more grim in Central and West Africa presumably for both the Nile and West African crocodiles. The crocodile population in this area is much more sparse, and has not been adequately surveyed. While the natural population in these areas may be lower due to a less-than-ideal environment and competition with sympatric slender-snouted and dwarf crocodiles, extirpation may be a serious threat in some of these areas. At some point in the 20th century, the Nile crocodile appeared to have been extirpated as a breeding species from Egypt, but has locally re-established in some areas such as the Aswan Dam. Additional factors are a loss of wetland habitats, which is addition to direct dredging, damming and irrigation by humans, has retracted in the east, south and north of the crocodile's range, possibly in correlation with global warming. Retraction of wetlands due both to direct habitat destruction by humans and environmental factor possibly related to global warming is perhaps linked to the extinction of Nile crocodiles in the last few centuries in Syria, Israel and Tunisia. In Lake St. Lucia, highly saline water has been pumped into the already brackish waters due to irrigation practices. Some deaths of crocodiles appeared to have been caused by this dangerous salinity, and this one-time stronghold for breeding crocodiles has experienced a major population decline. In yet another historic crocodile stronghold, the Olifants River, which flows through Kruger National Park, numerous crocodile deaths have been reported. These are officially due to unknown causes but analysis has indicated that environmental pollutants caused by humans, particularly the burgeoning coal industry, are the primary cause. Much of the contamination of crocodiles occurs when they consume fish themselves killed by pollutants. Additional ecological surveys and establishing management programs are necessary to resolve these questions.

The Nile crocodile is the top predator in its environment, and is responsible for checking the population of mesopredator species, such as the barbel catfish and lungfish, that could overeat fish populations on which other species, including birds, rely. One of the fish predators seriously affected by the unchecked mesopredator fish populations (due again to crocodile declines) is humans, particularly with respect to tilapia, an important commercial fish that has declined due to excessive predation. The Nile crocodile also consumes dead animals that would otherwise pollute the waters.

=== Attacks on humans ===
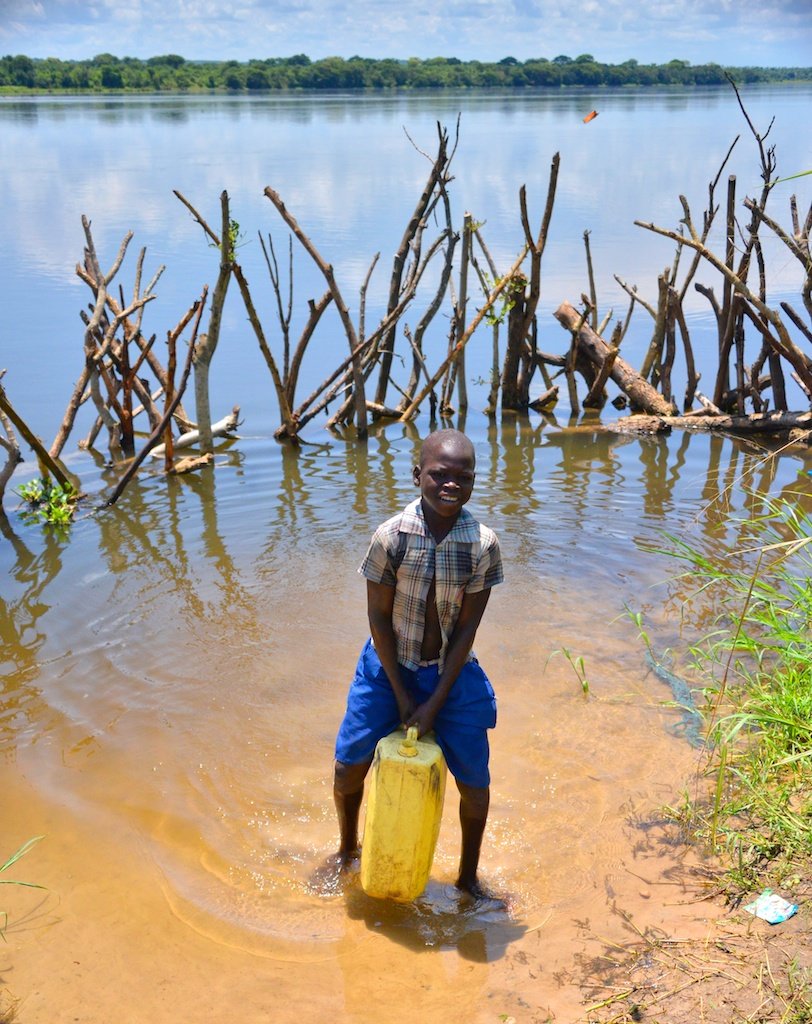
Barrier in Uganda to lessen the risk of crocodile attacks

Much of the hunting of and general animosity toward Nile crocodiles stems from their reputation as a man-eater, which is not entirely unjustified. Despite most attacks going unreported, the Nile crocodile along with the saltwater crocodile is estimated to kill hundreds (possibly thousands) of people each year, which is more than all other crocodilian species combined. While these species are much more aggressive toward people than other living crocodilians (as is statistically supported by estimated numbers of crocodile attacks), Nile crocodiles are not particularly more likely to behave aggressively to humans or regard humans as potential prey than saltwater crocodiles. However, unlike other "man-eating" crocodile species, including the saltwater crocodile, the Nile crocodile lives in close proximity to human populations through most of its range, so contact is more frequent. This combined with the species' large size creates a higher risk of attack. Crocodiles as small as 2.1 m (6 ft 11 in) are capable of overpowering and successfully preying on small apes and hominids, presumably including children and smaller adult humans, but a majority of fatal attacks on humans are by crocodiles reportedly exceeding 3 m (9 ft 10 in) in length.

In studies preceding the slaughter of crocodiles for the leather trade, when there were believed to be many more Nile crocodiles, a roughly estimated 1,000 human fatalities per annum by Nile crocodiles were posited, with a roughly equal number of aborted attacks. A more contemporary study claimed the number of attacks by Nile crocodiles per year as 275 to 745, of which 63% are fatal, as opposed to an estimated 30 attacks per year by saltwater crocodiles, of which 50% are fatal. With the Nile crocodile and the saltwater crocodile, the mean size of crocodiles involved in non-fatal attacks was about 3 m (9 ft 10 in) as opposed to a reported range of 2.5–5 m (8 ft 2 in – 16 ft 5 in) or larger for crocodiles responsible for fatal attacks. The average estimated size of Nile crocodiles involved in fatal attacks is 3.5 m (11 ft 6 in). Since a majority of fatal attacks are believed to be predatory in nature, the Nile crocodile can be considered the most prolific predator of humans among wild animals. In comparison, lions, in the years from 1990 to 2006, were responsible for an estimated one-eighth as many fatal attacks on humans in Africa as were Nile crocodiles. Although Nile crocodiles are more than a dozen times more numerous than lions in the wild, probably fewer than a quarter of living Nile crocodiles are old and large enough to pose a danger to humans. Other wild animals responsible for more annual human mortalities either attack humans in self-defense, as do venomous snakes, or are deadly only as vectors of disease or infection, such as snails, rats and mosquitos.

Regional reportage from numerous areas with large crocodile populations nearby indicate, per district or large village, that crocodiles often annually claim about a dozen or more lives per year. Miscellaneous examples of areas in the last few decades with a dozen or more fatal crocodile attacks annually include Korogwe District, Tanzania, Niassa Reserve, Mozambique, and the area around Lower Zambezi National Park, Zambia. Despite historic claims that the victims of Nile crocodile attacks are usually women and children, there is no detectable trends in this regard and any human, regardless of age, gender, or size is potentially vulnerable. Incautious human behavior is the primary drive behind crocodile attacks. Most fatal attacks occur when a person is standing a few feet away from water on a non-steep bank, is wading in shallow waters, is swimming or has limbs dangling over a boat or pier. Many victims are caught while crouching, and people in jobs that might require heavy usage of water, including laundry workers, fishermen, game wardens and regional guides, are more likely to be attacked. Many fishermen and other workers who are not poverty-stricken will go out of their way to avoid waterways known to harbor large crocodile populations.

Most biologists who have engaged in months or even years of field work with Nile crocodiles, including Cott (1961), Graham and Beard (1968) and Guggisberg (1972), have found that with sufficient precautions, their own lives and the lives of their local guides were rarely, if ever, at risk in areas with many crocodiles. However, Guggisberg accumulated several earlier writings that noted the lack of fear of crocodiles among Africans, driven in part perhaps by poverty and superstition, that caused many observed cases of an "appalling" lack of caution within view of large crocodiles, as opposed to the presence of bold lions, which engendered an appropriate panic. Per Guggisberg, this disregard (essentially regarding the crocodile as a lowly creature and thus non-threatening to humans) may account for the higher frequency of deadly attacks by crocodiles than by large mammalian carnivores. Most locals are well aware of how to behave in crocodile-occupied areas, and some of the writings quoted by Guggisberg from the 19th and 20th century may need to be taken with a "grain of salt".
