= Czy jesteś mądrzejszy od 5-klasisty? =

- Directed by: Bartłomiej Jastrzębowski
- Starring: Robert Korólczyk (2007–2008); Marzena Rogalska (2008–2009)
- Opening theme: Czy jesteś mądrzejszy od 5-klasisty?
- Country of origin: Poland
- Original language: Polish
- No. of episodes: ca. 300

Production
- Executive producer: Mastiff Media
- Running time: ca. 45 minutes (excluding ad breaks)

Original release
- Network: TV Puls
- Release: 29 October 2007 – June 2009

Czy jesteś mądrzejszy od 5-klasisty? is the Polish version of the Are You Smarter Than a Fifth Grader? format. The show debuted on October 29, 2007 on TV Puls. The first series was hosted by comedian Robert Korólczyk but later he was replaced by journalist Marzena Rogalska. The rules of the game were roughly the same as in the original US version.

== Money ladder ==
October 2007 – June 2008:

- 1. question • PLN 100
- 2. question • PLN 250
- 3. question • PLN 500
- 4. question • PLN 1,000
- 5. question • PLN 2,500 (guaranteed)
- 6. question • PLN 5,000
- 7. question • PLN 10,000
- 8. question • PLN 25,000
- 9. question • PLN 50,000
- 10. question • PLN 100,000
- 11. question • PLN 300,000 (grand prize)

September 2008 – June 2009:

- 1. question • PLN 50
- 2. question • PLN 100
- 3. question • PLN 200
- 4. question • PLN 500
- 5. question • PLN 1,500 (guaranteed)
- 6. question • PLN 3,000
- 7. question • PLN 6,000
- 8. question • PLN 12,000
- 9. question • PLN 24,000
- 10. question • PLN 48,000
- 11. question • PLN 100,000 (grand prize)

At least two people have won the grand prize – Aleksandra Chomacka (PLN 300,000) and Marcin Bielicki (PLN 100,000).
