= Dangerous Encounters with Brady Barr =

Dangerous Encounters with Brady Barr is a television program hosted by Brady Barr on Nat Geo Wild, National Geographic Channel's sister network. It originally started on the flagship network.

== Episodes ==
- Bite Force
- Monster Bite
- Closest Encounters
- Countdown Crocs
- Deadliest Snakes
- Dens Of Danger
- Monster Crocs (a.k.a. Size Matters)
- Speed Kills
- Barr V. Bear
- Python Attack
- Return To The Python Cave
- Hippo Steakout
- Shark From The Abyss
- Slimy Monsters
- Super Snake
- Venomland
- A Life Captured
- Hog Wild
- Dragon Hunt
- Wild West
- Shocking
- Cannibal Squid
- Blind Crocs Mystery
- Croc Crisis
- Blind Croc Mystery
- Something is blinding American crocs in Costa Rica's Tarcoles River. Join Brady, Thomas and Nick to solve the mystery.
- Hippo Stakeout
- Monster Crocs
- Snakebot
- Man-Eaters
- Shark Bite
- Extreme Fish
- To Catch A Hippo
- Barr Vs Bear
