= Brady Barr =

American herpetologist and documentary filmmaker

- Born: Brady Robert Barr; January 4, 1963 (age 62); Bloomington, Indiana, U.S.
- Education: Indiana University Bloomington (BS); University of Miami (Ph.D)
- Occupations: Herpetologist and television personality
- Years active: 1985—present
- Notable work: Dangerous Encounters with Brady Barr
- Spouse: Mei Sanchez-Barr
- Children: Braxton and Isabella Barr
- Website: Dangerous Encounters

Brady Robert Barr (born January 4, 1963) is a herpetologist and host of Nat Geo Wild's Dangerous Encounters with Brady Barr. He began working with National Geographic in 1997. Barr has also been the host for two other series, Reptile Wild and Croc Chronicles.

== Early life and education ==
Barr was born in Bloomington, Indiana, on January 4, 1963. He graduated from Indiana University School of Education with a B.S. in Science Education and later became a high school teacher. He earned a Ph.D from the University of Miami.

== Career ==
Barr became the first known herpetologist to have captured all 23 extant species of crocodilians in his career.

Barr is the author of a children's book about citizen science and American crocodiles.

In 2012, Barr testified at a Subcommittee Hearing on HR511, which prohibited the importation of various species of constrictor snakes, after he approached the U.S. Association of Reptile Keepers (USARK) to offer his expertise.
