= Tibetan woolly flying squirrel =

Scientific classification
- Kingdom: Animalia
- Phylum: Chordata
- Class: Mammalia
- Order: Rodentia
- Family: Sciuridae
- Genus: Eupetaurus
- Species: E. tibetensis

Binomial name
- Eupetaurus tibetensis Jackson, Helgen, Q. Li & Jiang, 2021

Species of squirrel

The Tibetan woolly flying squirrel (Eupetaurus tibetensis) is a species of very large flying squirrel in the genus Eupetaurus. It is found in the south-central portion of the Tibetan Plateau, namely south-central Tibet, northern Sikkim, and western Bhutan.

It is thought to be the sister species to the Yunnan woolly flying squirrel (E. nivamons), from which it likely diverged during the Pliocene-Pleistocene boundary. It differs from the western woolly flying squirrel (E. cinereus) in its saturated brown pelage with a reddish tinge, and differs from E. nivamons in its black tail tip being much longer than that of E. nivamons.

Although its existence was known since 1879, due to the very few specimens collected, it remained undescribed until 2021. It is only known from several historical specimens. It has been recommended that it be classified as Data Deficient on the IUCN Red List.

== See also ==
- List of living mammal species described in the 2020s
