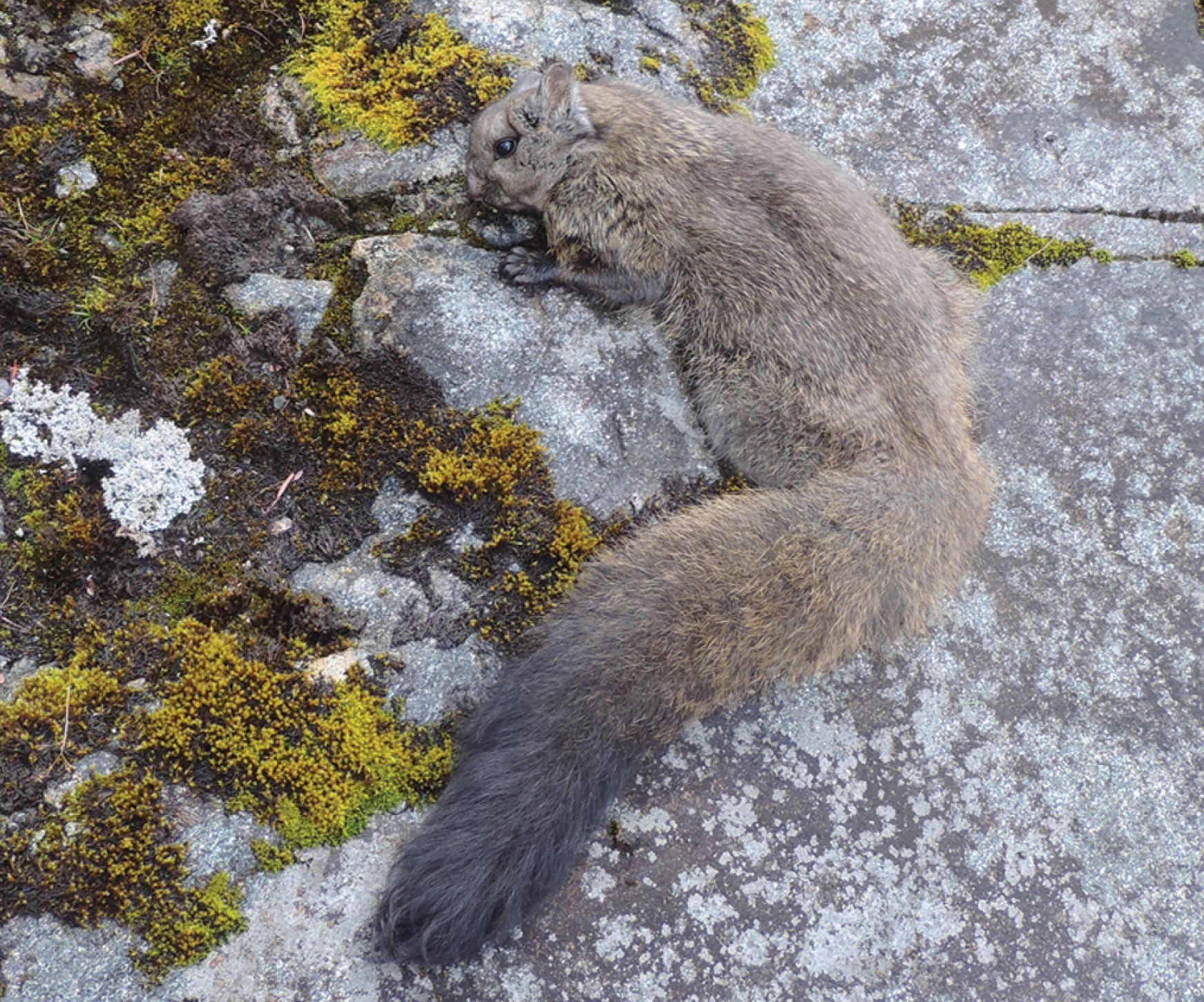

Scientific classification
- Kingdom: Animalia
- Phylum: Chordata
- Class: Mammalia
- Order: Rodentia
- Family: Sciuridae
- Genus: Eupetaurus
- Species: E. nivamons

Binomial name
- Eupetaurus nivamons Q. Li, Jiang, Jackson & Helgen, 2021

= Yunnan woolly flying squirrel =

Species of squirrel

The Yunnan woolly flying squirrel (Eupetaurus nivamons) is a species of very large flying squirrel in the genus Eupetaurus. It is found on the southeastern margin of the Himalayas, namely in northwestern Yunnan and potentially Myanmar.

It is thought to be the sister species to the Tibetan woolly flying squirrel (E. tibetensis), from which it likely diverged during the Pliocene-Pleistocene boundary. It differs from the western woolly flying squirrel (E. cinereus) in its more saturated brown dorsal pelage, and differs from E. tibetensis in its much shorter black tail tip. It also has a much wider rostrum than the other two Eupetaurus species.

It has been documented (through both specimens and camera trap images) from two localities; Mount Gaoligong, the highest peak of the Gaoligong Mountains and a nationally protected nature reserve, and Biluo Snow Mountain, which is currently unprotected. In 2020, during a biodiversity survey conducted in northwestern Bhutan, images of a woolly flying squirrel closely resembling E. nivamons were captured via camera trap within the confines of Jigme Dorji National Park, though further research is necessary to positively identify the photographed specimen. It is thought to inhabit steep cliffs on alpine tundra, where it feeds on Juniperus squamata. Evidence for species activity is known even in the coldest and snowiest months of the year, indicating that it does not hibernate or migrate from the area. Due to its rarity and small habitat area, as well as the potential threats its alpine habitat faces from climate change, it has been recommended it be classified as Near Threatened on the IUCN Red List.

== See also ==
- List of living mammal species described in the 2020s
- Mount Gaoligong flying squirrel, another species of large flying squirrel that was first described from Mount Gaoligong
