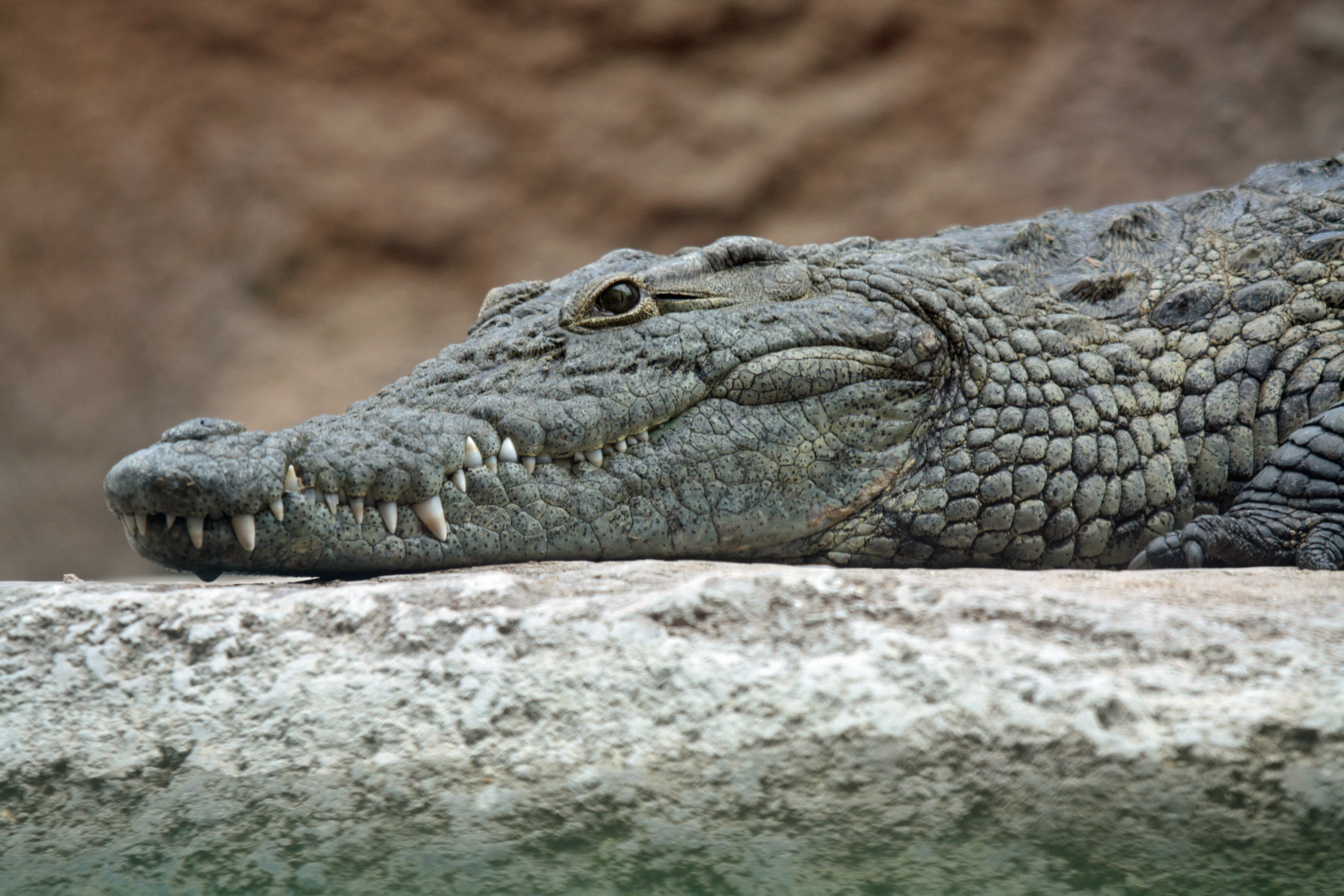
- Nile crocodile (Crocodylus niloticus)
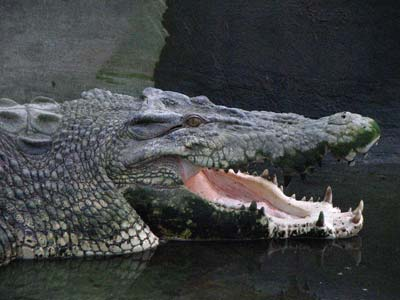
- Saltwater crocodile (Crocodylus porosus)

Scientific classification
- Kingdom: Animalia
- Phylum: Chordata
- Class: Reptilia
- Order: Crocodylia
- Superfamily: Crocodyloidea
- Family: Crocodylidae; Cuvier, 1807

Type genus
- Crocodylus Laurenti, 1768

Subfamilies
- Crocodylinae; Osteolaeminae
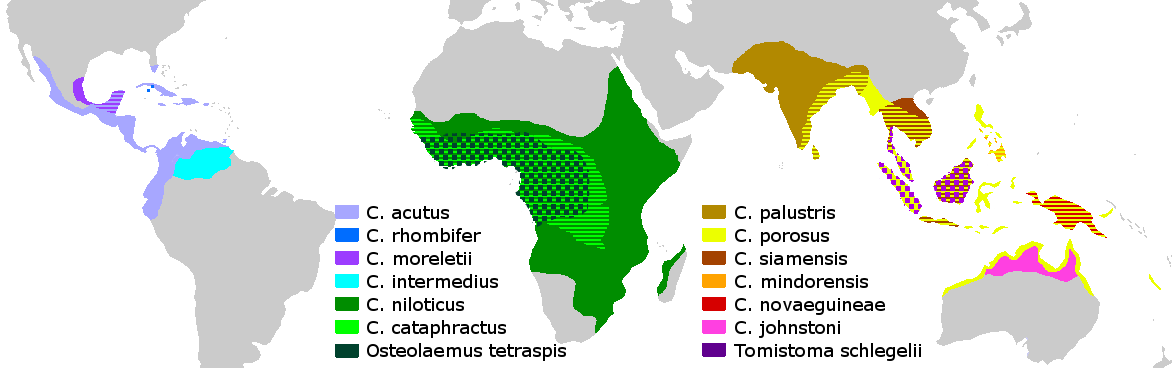
- Global distribution of crocodile species

= Crocodile =

Crocodile Temporal range: Eocene–Holocene, 46–0 Ma

Family of large reptilian carnivores

A crocodile (family Crocodylidae) or true crocodile is a large, semiaquatic reptile that lives throughout the tropics in Africa, Asia, the Americas and Australia. The term "crocodile" is sometimes used more loosely to include all extant members of the order Crocodilia, which includes the alligators and caimans (both members of the family Alligatoridae), the gharial and false gharial (both members of the family Gavialidae) as well as other extinct taxa. This article uses "crocodile" or "true crocodile" to refer only to the species taxonomically included in the Crocodylidae family, extant or extinct.

Crocodile size, morphology, behaviour and ecology differ among species. However, they have many similarities in these areas as well. All crocodiles are semiaquatic and tend to congregate in freshwater habitats such as rivers, lakes, wetlands and sometimes in brackish water and saltwater. They are carnivorous animals, feeding mostly on vertebrates such as fish, reptiles, birds and mammals, and sometimes on invertebrates such as molluscs and crustaceans, depending on species and age. All crocodiles are tropical species that, unlike alligators, are very sensitive to cold. Many species are at the risk of extinction, some being classified as critically endangered.

== Etymology ==
The word crocodile (croc.) was derived during the Middle English period from the transliteration krokódilos of a Greek (Note: The Ancient Greek words for croc. were: σοῦχος which was the Ancient Egyptian croc. and, probably, ὀδοντοτύραννος the Ancient Indian croc.) word which translates as "stones worm". (Note: It has been suggested, that the word parts croc. & dile are compounded from krokè ('pebbles'), and drilos / deilos ('worm'), although the former is only attested as a "a stripling" a colloquialism for a young man, or, a circumcised man the latter in ancient sources in fact is interpreted as: cowardly, vile, worthless, lowborn, mean) Through Ancient Greece the English language word has developed from Grecian origination in Anatolia.

A very early extant Ancient Greek source is an Aesop's Fable named Ἀλώπηξ καὶ κροκόδειλος of the sixth century BC. Herodotus a century after in consideration of the Greek word thought it was from the Ionic period.

The Latin language word crocodilus existed in first century AD in the work Naturalis Historia of Pliny the Elder. Examples in writing in the sixth and seventh century AD, crocodillorum and crocodili existed, though corcodrillus and cocodrillus were forms in Medieval Latin. The Latin form is found as cocodrille c. the 13th century in the Old French work Li livres dou tresor, in which the croc. is jaune (yellow).

The earliest known source in the English language is within the work Kyng Alisaunder from towards the beginning of the 14th century, a magical romance poetry work of rhyming couplets, where the word is found line 5720:

Forth went the kyng wondres sekynde :
A griselich hest he gonne fynde;
So mychel seigh he neuere, ne non swiche;
Two heudes it had wel ferlich
To a cokedrill that on was liche,
That others the monoceros selcouthliche. (Note: The croc. in question was an Indian croc. The text tells the tale of Alexander of Macedonia: Weber p.226 - "Alexander returns into Upper India where he defeats the inhabitants - The host attacked by a monstrous beast, and by elephants," (text form: olifauntz, line 5734) "which are subdued"; commences line 5688: The kynge thennes went forth, Ayein into Ynde in the north, That is y-cleped, als I fynde In the book, the vpper Ynde.)

Writing sometime after 1483 on his visit to the Holy Lands Felix Fabri in German and Latin mentions the Cocodrillen and cocodrillos respectively. (Note: The modern / current German term is: das Krokodil) By 1538 the exact same form of the modern word as the current English is found in French; (Note: Is shown in Gessner, 1560, Historiæ animalium p. 54 as "GALLICE Crocodile" (i.e. French) - see: p.27^{:}) croc. is within a poem of Edmund Spenser, (Note: PROSOPOPOIA.Or Mother Hubberds Tale. Then vnto him all monstrous beasts resorted Bred of two kindes, as Griffons, Minotaures, Crocodiles, Dragons, Beauers, and Centaures: With those himselfe he strengthned mightelie, That feare he neede no force of enemie.) thought written in 1579–80, and in the works of William Shakespeare, who died in 1616. The similitude of the English word formation to a Latin source was caused at least by the transmission of a relevant ancient science from the influx of the publication of translations of Pliny the Elder some time towards the end of fourteenth and, or, beginning of fifteenth century. The publication of concrete realization in the anatomical work of Andreas Vesalius during 1543 inspired the creation of monographs and books of animals contributing to new science in zoology.

== Taxonomy and phylogeny ==
Crocodylidae was named as a family by Georges Cuvier in 1807. It belongs to the larger superfamily Crocodyloidea, which also includes additional extinct crocodile relatives. These all belong to the order Crocodilia, which also includes alligators and gharials.

Although crocodiles, alligators, and the gharial are similar in appearance, they belong to separate biological families. The gharial, with its narrow snout, is easier to distinguish, while morphological differences are more difficult to spot in crocodiles and alligators. The most obvious external differences are visible in the head, with crocodiles having narrower and longer heads, with a more V-shaped than a U-shaped snout compared to alligators and caimans. Another obvious trait is that the upper and lower jaws of the crocodiles are the same width, and the teeth in the lower jaw fall along the edge or outside the upper jaw when the mouth is closed; therefore, all teeth are visible, unlike an alligator, which possesses in the upper jaw small depressions into which the lower teeth fit. Also, when the crocodile's mouth is closed, the large fourth tooth in the lower jaw fits into a constriction in the upper jaw. For hard-to-distinguish specimens, the protruding tooth is the most reliable feature to define the species' family. Crocodiles have more webbing on the toes of the hind feet and can better tolerate saltwater due to specialized salt glands for filtering out salt, which are present, but non-functioning, in alligators. Another trait that separates crocodiles from other crocodilians is their much higher levels of aggression.

Crocodylidae is cladistically defined as a crown group composed of the last common ancestor of the Nile crocodile (Crocodylus niloticus), the Dwarf crocodile (Osteolaemus tetraspis), and all of its descendants. It contains two subfamilies: Crocodylinae and Osteolaeminae. Crocodylinae contains 13–14 living species, as well as 6 extinct species. Osteolaeminae was named by Christopher Brochu in 2003 as a subfamily of Crocodylidae separate from Crocodylinae, and contains the two extant genera Osteolaemus and Mecistops, along with several extinct genera. The number of extant species within Osteolaeminae is currently in question.

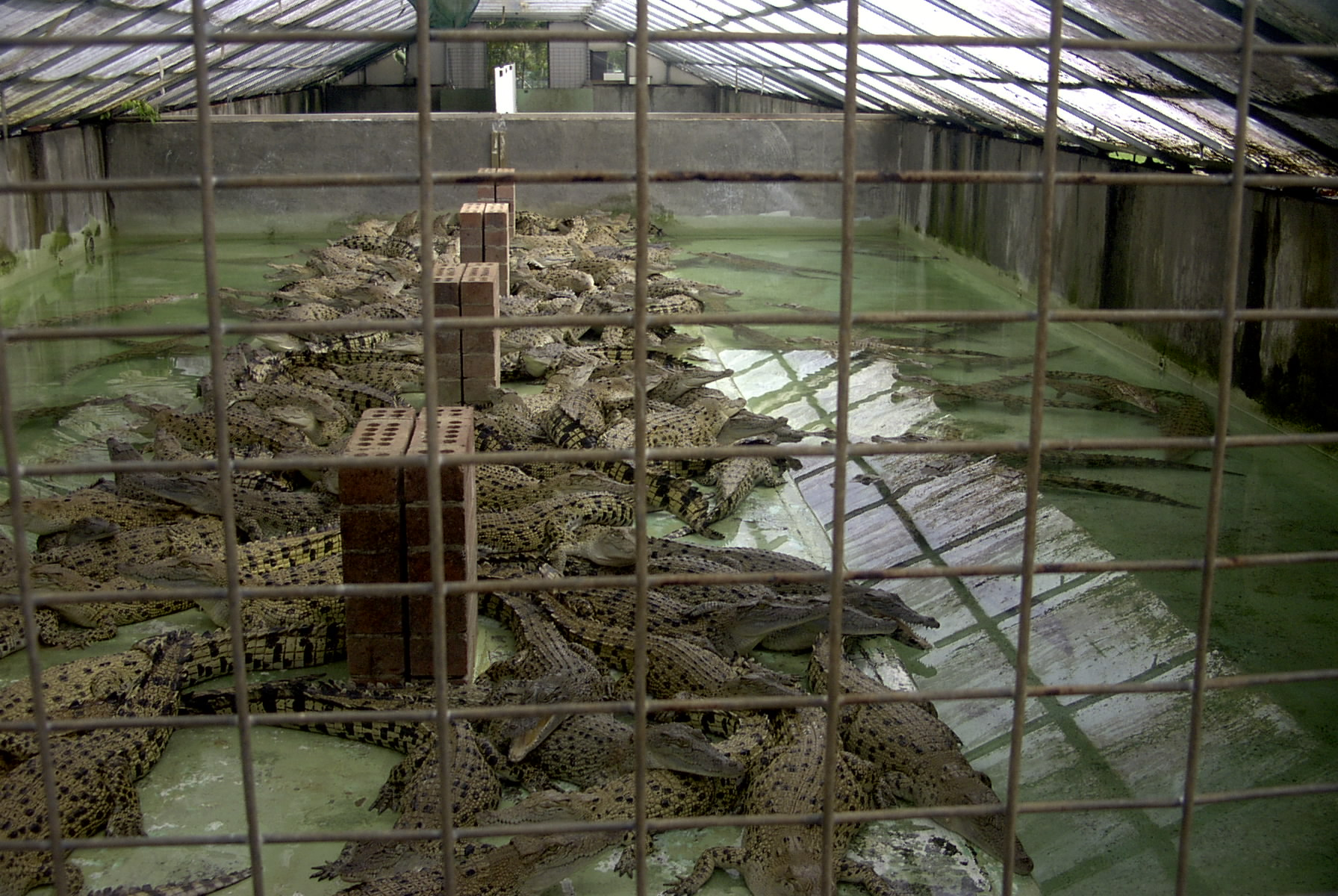
Crocodile farming in Australia

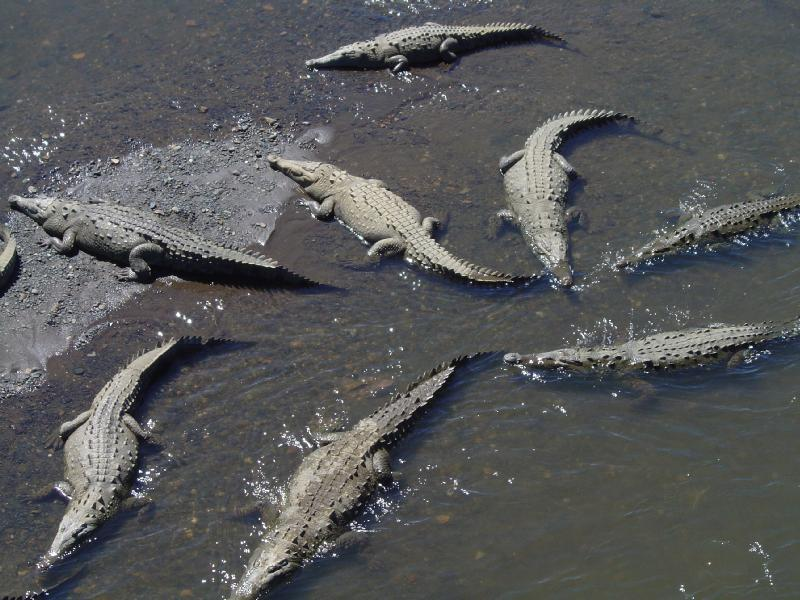
Crocodiles in Costa Rica

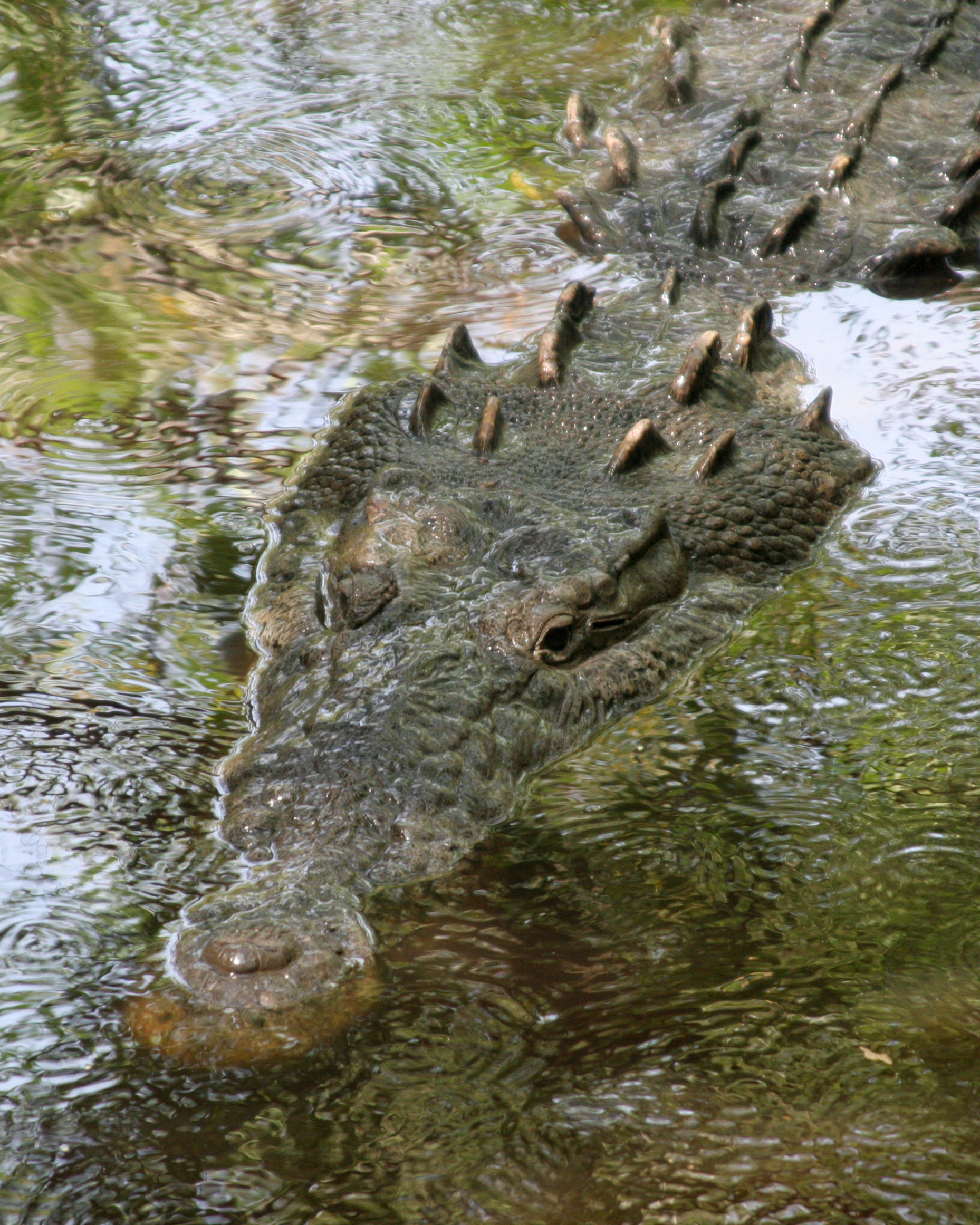
American crocodile at La Manzanilla, Jalisco, Mexico

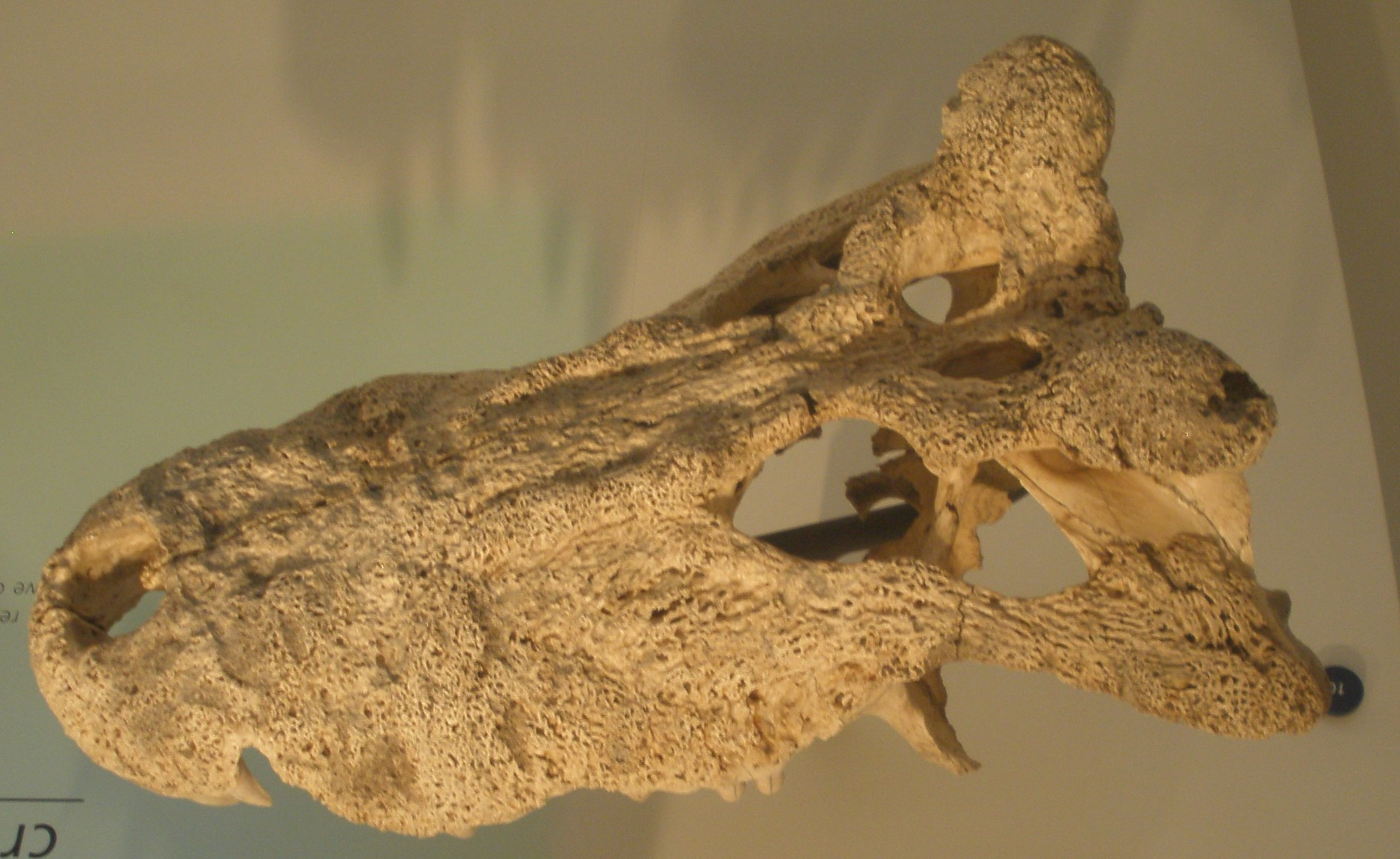
A skull of the extinct Voay robustus

- Subfamily Crocodylinae
  - Genus Crocodylus
    - Crocodylus acutus, American crocodile
    - Crocodylus halli, Hall's New Guinea crocodile found South of the New Guinea Highlands
    - Crocodylus intermedius, Orinoco crocodile
    - Crocodylus johnsoni, freshwater crocodile, or Johnstone's crocodile
    - Crocodylus mindorensis, Philippine crocodile
    - Crocodylus moreletii, Morelet's crocodile or Mexican crocodile
    - Crocodylus niloticus, Nile crocodile or African crocodile (the subspecies found in Madagascar is sometimes called the black crocodile)
    - Crocodylus novaeguineae, New Guinea crocodile found North of the New Guinea Highlands
      - Crocodylus raninus, the Borneo crocodile, is related to C. novaeguineae, but whether or not it is a distinct species remains unclear.
    - Crocodylus palustris, mugger, marsh or Indian crocodile
    - Crocodylus porosus, saltwater crocodile or estuarine crocodile
    - Crocodylus rhombifer, Cuban crocodile
    - Crocodylus siamensis, Siamese crocodile (may be extinct in the wild)
    - Crocodylus suchus, West African crocodile, desert or sacred crocodile
    - Crocodylus anthropophagus†
    - Crocodylus checchiai†
    - Crocodylus falconensis†
    - Crocodylus palaeindicus†
    - Crocodylus thorbjarnarsoni†
  - Genus Voay†
    - Voay robustus† (formerly Crocodylus robustus)
- Subfamily Osteolaeminae
  - Genus Osteolaemus
    - Osteolaemus tetraspis, dwarf crocodile
    - Osteolaemus osborni, Osborn's dwarf crocodile
    - Recent (2009) DNA analysis indicate a third distinct species, currently unnamed.
  - Genus Mecistops
    - Mecistops cataphractus West African slender-snouted crocodile
    - Mecistops leptorhynchus Central African slender-snouted crocodile
  - Genus Brochuchus†
    - Brochuchus pigotti† (formerly Crocodylus pigotti)
    - Brochuchus parvidens†
  - Genus Euthecodon†
    - Euthecodon nitriae†
    - Euthecodon brumpti†
    - Euthecodon arambourgi†
  - Genus Rimasuchus†
    - Rimasuchus lloydi† (formerly Crocodylus lloydi)

=== Phylogeny ===
Recent molecular studies using DNA sequencing have shown crocodiles to be more closely related to the gavialids rather than to alligators, contrary to prior theories based on morphological studies alone.

Below is a cladogram showing the relationships of the major extant crocodile groups based on molecular studies, excluding separate extinct taxa:

- Crocodilia
  - Alligatoridae
    - Caimaninae
      - - Caiman
        - Melanosuchus
      - Paleosuchus
    - Alligatorinae
      Alligator
  - Longirostres
    - Crocodylidae
      - Crocodylus
      - - Mecistops
        - Osteolaemus
    - Gavialidae
      - Gavialis
      - Tomistoma

Below is a more detailed cladogram of Crocodylidae, based on a 2021 study using paleogenomics that extracted DNA from the extinct Voay. Recently recognised species (M. leptorhynchus, C. halli and the third Osteolaemus species) placed according to 2023 study by Sales-Oliveira et al.

- Crocodylidae (crown group)
  - Osteolaeminae
    - - - Mecistops cataphractus West African slender-snouted crocodile
        - Mecistops leptorhynchus Central African slender-snouted crocodile
      - Euthecodon †
    - - Brochuchus †
      - - Rimasuchus †
        - - - Osteolaemus osborni Osborn's dwarf crocodile
          - - Osteolaemus tetraspis Dwarf crocodile
            - Osteolaemus sp. West
  - Crocodylinae
    - Voay
      Voay robustus †
    - Crocodylus
      - - - Crocodylus anthropophagus †
          - Crocodylus thorbjarnarsoni †
        - - Crocodylus palaeindicus †
          - Crocodylus Tirari Desert †
      - - - - - - Crocodylus johnstoni Freshwater crocodile
            - - - Crocodylus novaeguineae New Guinea crocodile
                - Crocodylus halli Hall's New Guinea crocodile
              - - Crocodylus mindorensis Philippine crocodile
          - - - - Crocodylus porosus Saltwater crocodile
            - - - Crocodylus siamensis Siamese crocodile
              - - Crocodylus palustris Mugger crocodile
        - - - Crocodylus checchiai †
            - Crocodylus falconensis †
          - - - - - - Crocodylus suchus West African crocodile
            - - - - - Crocodylus niloticus Nile crocodile
              - - - - Crocodylus rhombifer Cuban crocodile
                - - - Crocodylus intermedius Orinoco crocodile
                    - Crocodylus acutus American crocodile
                  - - Crocodylus moreletii Morelet's crocodile

Alternatively, some morphological studies have recovered Mecistops as a basal member of Crocodylinae, more closely related to Crocodylus than to Osteolaemus and the other members of Osteolaeminae, as shown in the cladogram below.

- Crocodylidae
  - Osteolaeminae
    - Rimasuchus lloydi†
    - - Voay robustus†
      - - Osteolaemus osborni Osborn's dwarf crocodile
        - Osteolaemus tetraspis Dwarf crocodile
    - - "Crocodylus" gariepensis†
      - - - Brochuchus parvidens†
          - Brochuchus pigotti†
        - - Euthecodon arambourgi†
          - Euthecodon brumpti†
  - Crocodylinae
    - Mecistops cataphractus West African slender-snouted crocodile
    - - - Crocodylus thorbjarnarsoni†
        - Crocodylus anthropophagus†
      - - Crocodylus niloticus Nile crocodile
        - - Crocodylus checchiai†
          - Crocodylus moreletii Morelet's crocodile
          - Crocodylus intermedius Orinoco crocodile
          - Crocodylus acutus American crocodile
          - Crocodylus rhombifer Cuban crocodile
        - Crocodylus palaeindicus†
        - - Crocodylus palustris Mugger crocodile
          - - - Crocodylus ossifragus†
              - Crocodylus siamensis Siamese crocodile
            - - Crocodylus mindorensis Philippine crocodile
              - Crocodylus johnstoni Freshwater crocodile
              - Crocodylus porosus Saltwater crocodile
              - - Crocodylus raninus Borneo crocodile
                - Crocodylus novaeguineae New Guinea crocodile

== Species ==
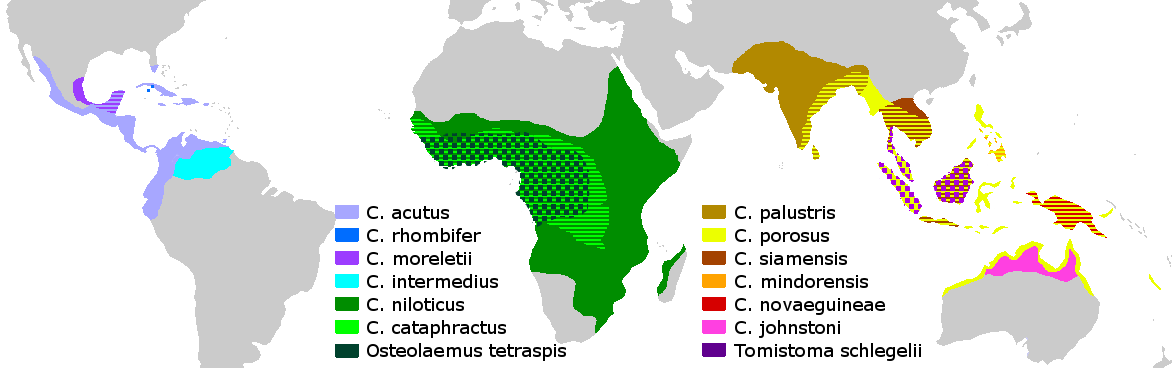
Distribution of crocodiles

A total of 18 extant species have been recognized. Further genetic study is needed for the confirmation of proposed species under the genus Osteolaemus.

Species name	Image	Distribution	Description/Comments
American crocodile (Crocodylus acutus)		Throughout the Caribbean Basin, including many of the Caribbean islands and South Florida.	A larger sized species, with a greyish colour and a prominent V-shaped snout. Prefers brackish water, but also inhabits lower stretches of rivers and true marine environments. This is one of the rare species that exhibits regular sea-going behaviour, which explains the great distribution throughout the Caribbean. It is also found in hypersaline lakes such as Lago Enriquillo, in the Dominican Republic, which has one of the largest populations of this species. Diet consists mostly of aquatic and terrestrial vertebrates. Classified as Vulnerable, but certain local populations under greater threat.
Hall's New Guinea crocodile (Crocodylus halli)		The island of New Guinea, south of the New Guinea Highlands	A smaller species that closely resembles and was long classified under the New Guinea crocodile, which it is now considered to be genetically distinct from. It lives south of the mountain barrier that divides the two species' ranges. It can be physically distinguished from the New Guinea crocodile by its shorter maxilla and enlarged postcranial elements. Cranial elements can still widely vary within the species, with populations from Lake Murray having much wider heads than those from the Aramia River.
Orinoco crocodile (Crocodylus intermedius)		Colombia and Venezuela	This is a large species with a relatively elongated snout and a pale tan coloration with scattered dark brown markings. Lives primarily in the Orinoco Basin. Despite having a rather narrow snout, preys on a wide variety of vertebrates, including large mammals. It is a Critically Endangered species.
Freshwater crocodile (Crocodylus johnstoni)		Northern Australia	A smaller species with a narrow and elongated snout. It has light brown coloration with darker bands on body and tail. Lives in rivers with considerable distance from the sea, to avoid confrontations with saltwater crocodiles. Feeds mostly on fish and other small vertebrates.
Philippine crocodile (Crocodylus mindorensis)		Endemic to the Philippines	This is a relatively small species with a rather broader snout. It has heavy dorsal armour and a golden-brown colour that darkens as the animal matures. Prefers freshwater habitats and feeds on a variety of small to medium sized vertebrates. This species is Critically Endangered and the most severely threatened species of crocodile.
Morelet's crocodile (Crocodylus moreletii)		Atlantic regions of Mexico, Belize and Guatemala	A small to medium sized crocodile with a rather broad snout. It has a dark greyish-brown colour and is found in mostly various freshwater habitats. Feeds on mammals, birds and reptiles. It is listed as Least Concern.
Nile crocodile (Crocodylus niloticus)		Sub-Saharan Africa	A large and aggressive species with a broad snout, especially in older animals. It has a dark bronze coloration and darkens as the animal matures. Lives in a variety of freshwater habitats but is also found in brackish water. It is an apex predator that is capable of taking a wide array of African vertebrates, including large ungulates and other predators. This species is listed as Least Concern.
New Guinea crocodile (Crocodylus novaeguineae)		The island of New Guinea, north of the New Guinea Highlands	A smaller species of crocodile with a grey-brown colour and dark brown to black markings on the tail. The young have a narrower V-shaped snout that becomes wider as the animal matures. Prefers freshwater habitats, even though is tolerant to salt water, in order to avoid competition and predation by the saltwater crocodile. This species feeds on small to mid-sized vertebrates.
Mugger crocodile (Crocodylus palustris)		The Indian subcontinent and surrounding countries	This is a modest sized crocodile with a very broad snout and an alligator-like appearance. It has dark-grey to brown coloration. Enlarged scutes around the neck make it a heavily armoured species. Prefers slow moving rivers, swamps and lakes. It can also be found in coastal swamps but avoids areas populated by saltwater crocodiles. Feeds on a wide array of vertebrates.
Saltwater crocodile (Crocodylus porosus)		Throughout Southeast Asia, Northern Australia and surrounding waters	The largest on average living reptile and most aggressive of all crocodiles. It is a big-headed species and has a relatively broad snout, especially when older. The coloration is pale yellow with black stripes when young but dark greenish-drab coloured as adults. Lives in brackish and marine environments as well as lower stretches of rivers. This species has the greatest distribution of all crocodiles. Tagged specimens showed long-distance marine travelling behaviour. It is the apex predator throughout its range and preys on virtually any animal within its reach. It is classified as Least Concern but with several populations under greater risk.
Borneo crocodile (Crocodylus raninus)		Island of Borneo in Southeast Asia	A freshwater species of crocodile that has been considered a synonym of the saltwater crocodile.
Cuban crocodile (Crocodylus rhombifer)		Found only in the Zapata Swamp and Isle of Youth of Cuba	It is a small but extremely aggressive species of crocodile that prefers freshwater swamps. The coloration is vibrant even as adults and the scales have a "pebbled" appearance. It is a relatively terrestrial species with agile locomotion on land, and sometimes displays terrestrial hunting. The snout is broad with a thick upper-jaw and large teeth. The unique characteristics and fossil record indicates a rather specialized diet in the past, preying on megafauna such as the giant sloth. This species sometimes displays pack-hunting behaviour, which might have been the key to hunting large species in the past, despite its small size. Today most prey are small to medium sized vertebrates. It is Critically Endangered, and the remaining wild population is under threat of hybridization.
Siamese crocodile (Crocodylus siamensis)		Indonesia, Brunei, East Malaysia and southern Indochina	A fairly small crocodile that prefers freshwater habitats. It has a relatively broad snout and olive-green to dark green coloration. It feeds on a variety of small to mid-sized vertebrates. Listed as Critically Endangered, but might be already extinct in the wild; status is unknown.
West African crocodile (Crocodylus suchus)		Western and Central Africa	Recent studies revealed that this is distinct species from the larger Nile crocodile. It has a slightly narrower snout and is much smaller compared to its larger cousin.
Osborn's dwarf crocodile (Osteolaemus osborni)		Western Africa	It is a heavily armoured species with uniform black coloration in adults, while juveniles have a lighter brown banding. Lives in the tropical forests of Western Africa. Feeds on small vertebrates and large aquatic invertebrates. It is a fairly terrestrial species and exhibits terrestrial hunting, especially at night.
Dwarf crocodile (Osteolaemus tetraspis)		Western Africa	It belongs to its own monotypic genus; however, new studies indicate there might be two or even three distinct species. It is a heavily armoured species with uniform black coloration in adults, while juveniles have a lighter brown banding. Lives in the tropical forests of Western Africa. Feeds on small vertebrates and large aquatic invertebrates. It is a fairly terrestrial species and exhibits terrestrial hunting, especially at night. This species is classified as Vulnerable.
West African slender-snouted crocodile (Mecistops cataphractus)		Western Africa	A medium sized species with a narrow and elongated snout. Lives in freshwater habitats within tropical forests of the continent. Feeds mostly on fish but also other small to medium sized vertebrates. It is a Critically Endangered species.
Central African slender-snouted crocodile (Mecistops leptorhynchus)		Central Africa	A medium sized species found in watery areas in dense rainforest. Feeds largely on fish. Insufficient conservation data, but was classified as Critically Endangered when lumped with M. cataphractus, although M. leptorhynchus is doing better in its home range.

== Characteristics ==
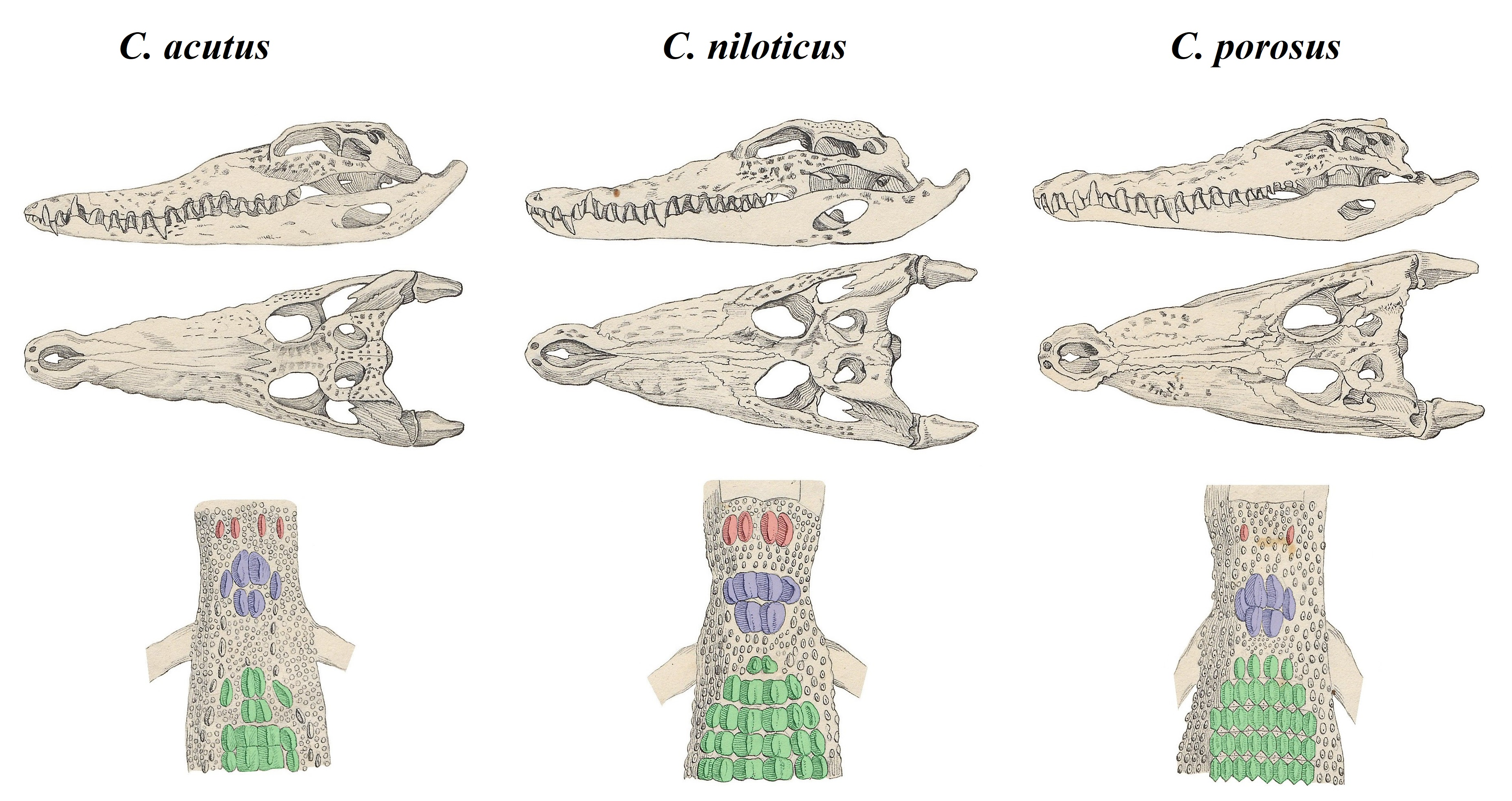
Skulls and scutes of American, Nile and Saltwater crocodiles, with post-occipital scutes highlighted in red, nuchal shield in blue and dorsal scutes in green

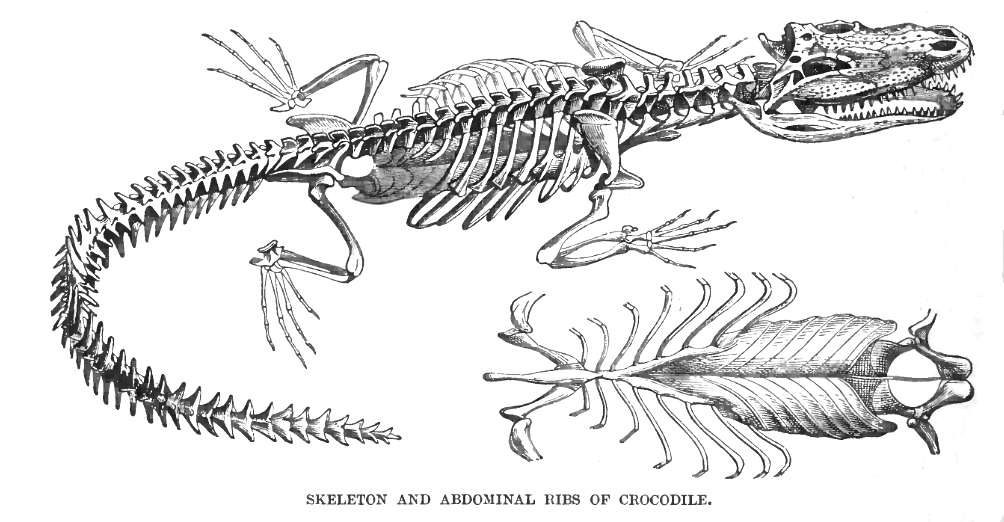
Crocodiles, like dinosaurs, have the abdominal ribs modified into gastralia.

Apart from the advantage conferred by its sufficiently large size relative to other animals in the ecosystem, other physical traits contribute a crocodile's position as predator. Its external morphology is a sign of its aquatic and predatory lifestyle. Its streamlined body enables it to swim swiftly; it also tucks its feet to the side while swimming, making it faster by decreasing water resistance. Crocodiles have webbed feet which, though not used to propel them through the water, allow them to make fast turns and sudden moves in the water or initiate swimming. Webbed feet are an advantage in shallow water, where the animals sometimes move around by walking. Crocodiles have a palatal flap, a rigid tissue at the back of the mouth that blocks the entry of water. The palate has a special path from the nostril to the glottis that bypasses the mouth. The nostrils are closed during submergence.

Like other archosaurs, crocodilians are diapsid, although their post-temporal fenestrae are reduced. The walls of the braincase are bony but lack supratemporal and postfrontal bones. Their tongues are not free, but held in place by a membrane that limits movement; as a result, crocodiles are unable to stick out their tongues. Crocodiles have smooth skin on their bellies and sides, while their dorsal surfaces are armoured with large osteoderms. The armoured skin has scales and is thick and rugged, providing some protection. They are still able to absorb heat through this armour, as a network of small capillaries allows blood through the scales to absorb heat. The osteoderms are highly vascularised and aid in calcium balance, both to neutralize acids while the animal cannot breathe underwater and to provide calcium for eggshell formation. Crocodilian tegument have pores believed to be sensory in function, analogous to the lateral line in fishes. They are particularly seen on their upper and lower jaws. Another possibility is that they are secretory, as they produce an oily substance which appears to flush mud off.

=== Size ===
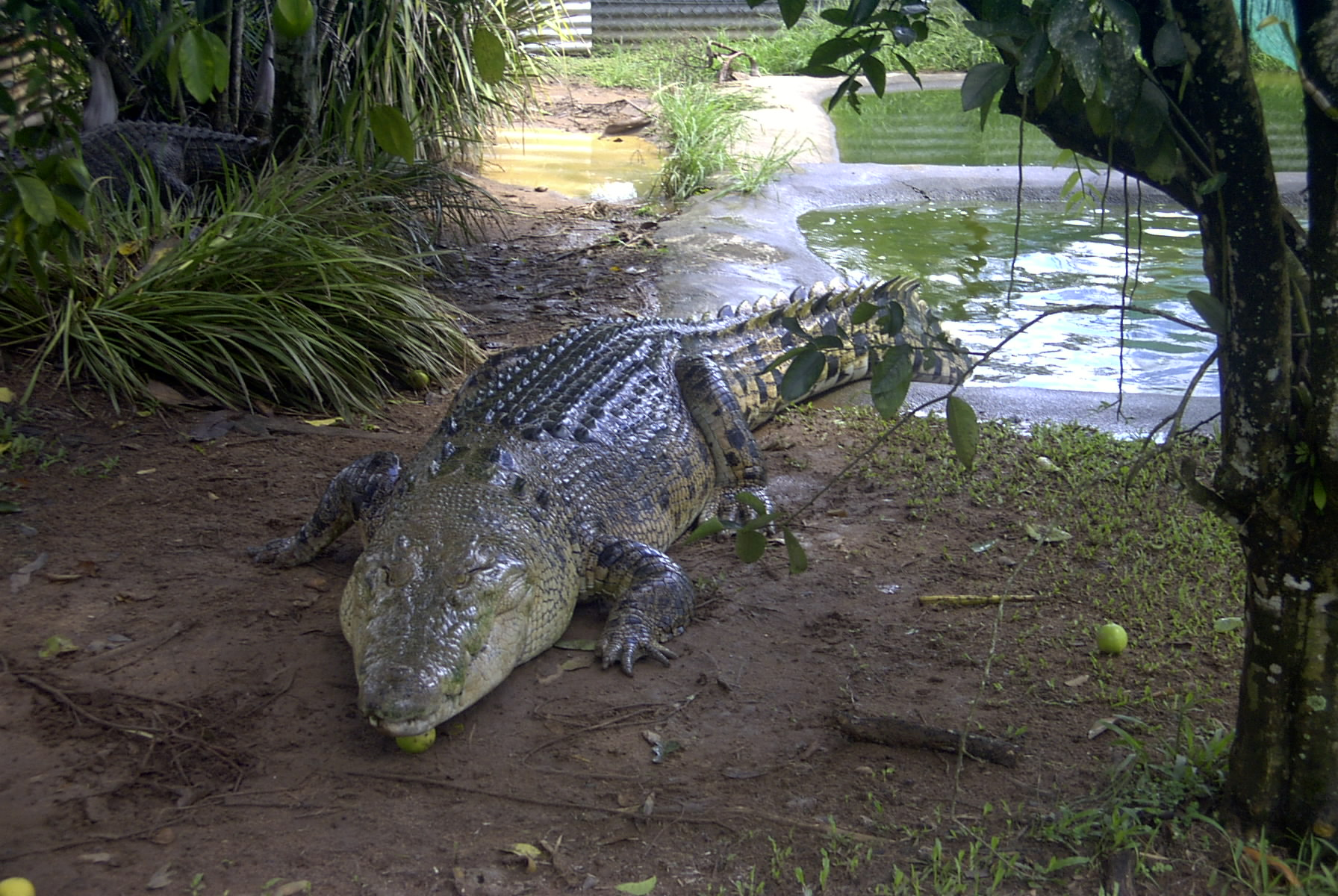
A saltwater crocodile in captivity

Size greatly varies among species, from the dwarf crocodile to the saltwater crocodile. Species of the dwarf crocodile Osteolaemus grow to an adult size of just 1.5 to 1.9 m (4.9 to 6.2 ft), whereas the saltwater crocodile can grow to sizes over 6 m (20 ft) and weigh over 1,000 kg (2,200 lb). Several other large species can reach over 5.2 m (17 ft) long and weigh over 900 kg (2,000 lb). Crocodilians show pronounced sexual dimorphism, with males growing much larger and more rapidly than females. Despite their large adult sizes, crocodiles start their lives at around 20 cm (7.9 in) long. The largest species of crocodile is the saltwater crocodile, found in eastern India, northern Australia, throughout South-east Asia, and in the surrounding waters.

The brain volume of two adult crocodiles was 5.6 cm^{3} for a spectacled caiman and 8.5 cm^{3} for a larger Nile crocodile.

The largest crocodile ever held in captivity is a saltwater–Siamese hybrid named Yai (Thai: ใหญ่, meaning big; 10 June 1972 – 15 August 2025) at the Samutprakarn Crocodile Farm and Zoo, Thailand. This animal measures 6 m (20 ft) in length and weighs 1,200 kg (2,600 lb).

The longest crocodile captured alive was Lolong, a saltwater crocodile which was measured at 6.17 m (20.2 ft) and weighed at 1,075 kg (2,370 lb) by a National Geographic team in Agusan del Sur Province, Philippines.

=== Teeth ===
Crocodiles are polyphyodonts; they are able to replace each of their 80 teeth up to 50 times in their 35- to 75-year lifespan. Next to each full-grown tooth, there is a small replacement tooth and an odontogenic stem cell in the dental lamina in standby that can be activated if required.

== Biology and behaviour ==
Crocodilians are more closely related to birds and other dinosaurs than to most animals classified as reptiles, the three families being included in the group Archosauria ('ruling reptiles'). Despite their prehistoric look, crocodiles are among the more biologically complex reptiles. Unlike other reptiles, a crocodile has a cerebral cortex and a four-chambered heart. Crocodilians also have the functional equivalent of a diaphragm by incorporating muscles used for aquatic locomotion into respiration. Salt glands are present in the tongues of crocodiles and they have a pore opening on the surface of the tongue, a trait that separates them from alligators. Salt glands are dysfunctional in Alligatoridae. Their function appears to be similar to that of salt glands in marine turtles. Crocodiles do not have sweat glands and release heat through their mouths. They often sleep with their mouths open and may pant like a dog. Four species of freshwater crocodile climb trees to bask in areas lacking a shoreline.

=== Senses ===
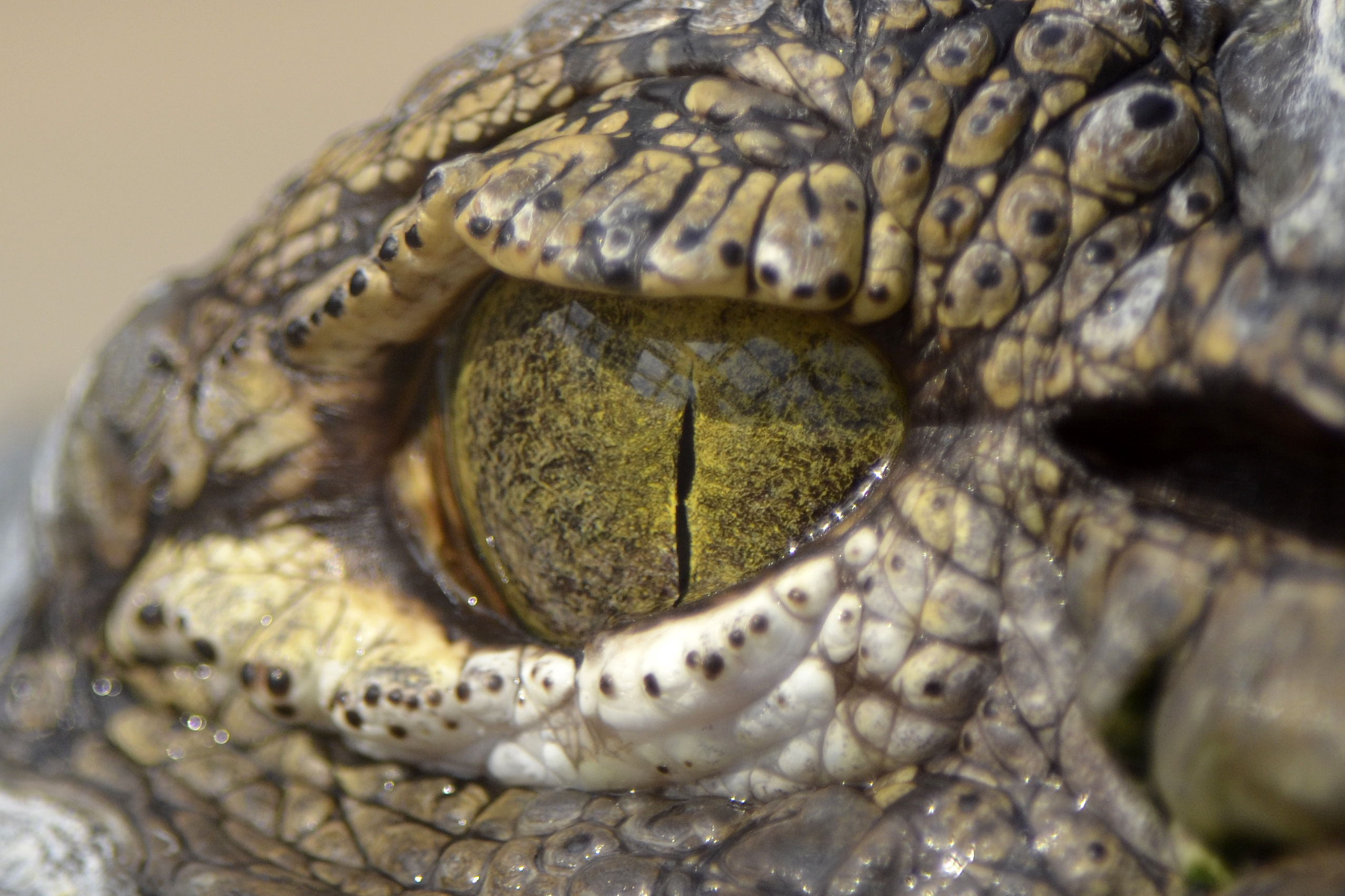
Crocodile eye

Crocodiles have acute senses, an evolutionary advantage that makes them successful predators. The eyes, ears and nostrils are located on top of the head, allowing the crocodile to lie low in the water, almost totally submerged and hidden from prey.

==== Vision ====
Crocodiles have very good night vision, and are mostly nocturnal hunters. They use the disadvantage of most prey animals' poor nocturnal vision to their advantage. The light receptors in crocodilians' eyes include cones and numerous rods, so it is assumed all crocodilians can see colors. Crocodiles have vertical-slit shaped pupils, similar to those of domestic cats. One explanation for the evolution of slit pupils is that they exclude light more effectively than a circular pupil, helping to protect the eyes during daylight. On the rear wall of the eye is a tapetum lucidum, which reflects incoming light back onto the retina, thus utilizing the small amount of light available at night to best advantage. In addition to the protection of the upper and lower eyelids, crocodiles have a nictitating membrane (sometimes called a "third eyelid") that can be drawn over the eye from the inner corner while the lids are open. The eyeball surface is thus protected under the water while a certain degree of vision is still possible.

==== Olfaction ====
Crocodilian sense of smell is also very well developed, aiding them to detect prey or animal carcasses that are either on land or in water, from far away. It is possible that crocodiles use olfaction in the egg prior to hatching.

Chemoreception in crocodiles is especially interesting because they hunt in both terrestrial and aquatic surroundings. Crocodiles have only one olfactory chamber and the vomeronasal organ is absent in the adults indicating all olfactory perception is limited to the olfactory system. Behavioural and olfactometer experiments indicate that crocodiles detect both air-borne and water-soluble chemicals and use their olfactory system for hunting. When above water, crocodiles enhance their ability to detect volatile odorants by gular pumping, a rhythmic movement of the floor of the pharynx. Crocodiles close their nostrils when submerged, so olfaction underwater is unlikely. Underwater food detection is presumably gustatory and tactile.

==== Hearing ====
Crocodiles can hear well; their tympanic membranes are concealed by flat flaps that may be raised or lowered by muscles.

==== Touch ====
The touch sensors, concentrated in crocodile skin, can be thicker than those in human fingerprints. Crocodiles can feel touch on their skin.

Cranial: The upper and lower jaws are covered with sensory pits, visible as small, black speckles on the skin, the crocodilian version of the lateral line organs seen in fish and many amphibians, though arising from a completely different origin. These pigmented nodules encase bundles of nerve fibers innervated beneath by branches of the trigeminal nerve. They respond to the slightest disturbance in surface water, detecting vibrations and small pressure changes as small as a single drop. This makes it possible for crocodiles to detect prey, danger and intruders, even in total darkness. These sense organs are known as domed pressure receptors (DPRs).

Post-Cranial: While alligators and caimans have DPRs only on their jaws, crocodiles have similar organs on almost every scale on their bodies. The function of the DPRs on the jaws is clear; to catch prey, but it is still not clear what the function is of the organs on the rest of the body. The receptors flatten when exposed to increased osmotic pressure, such as that experienced when swimming in sea water hyperosmotic to the body fluids. When contact between the integument and the surrounding sea water solution is blocked, crocodiles are found to lose their ability to discriminate salinities. It has been proposed that the flattening of the sensory organ in hyperosmotic sea water is sensed by the animal as "touch", but interpreted as chemical information about its surroundings. This might be why in alligators they are absent on the rest of the body.

=== Hunting and diet ===
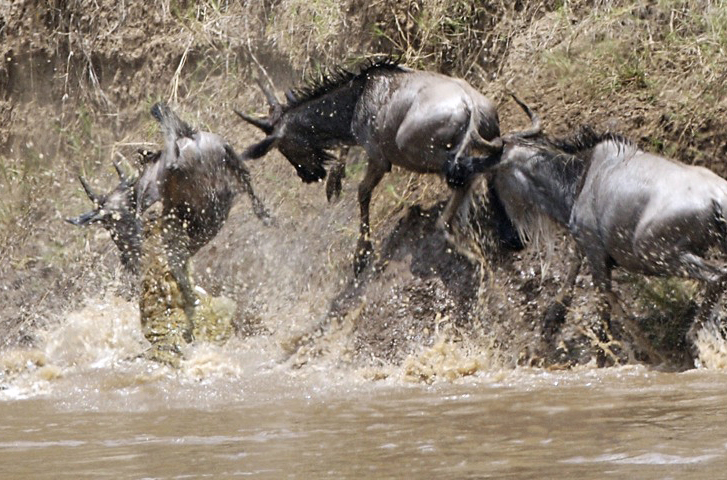
Nile crocodile attacking wildebeest

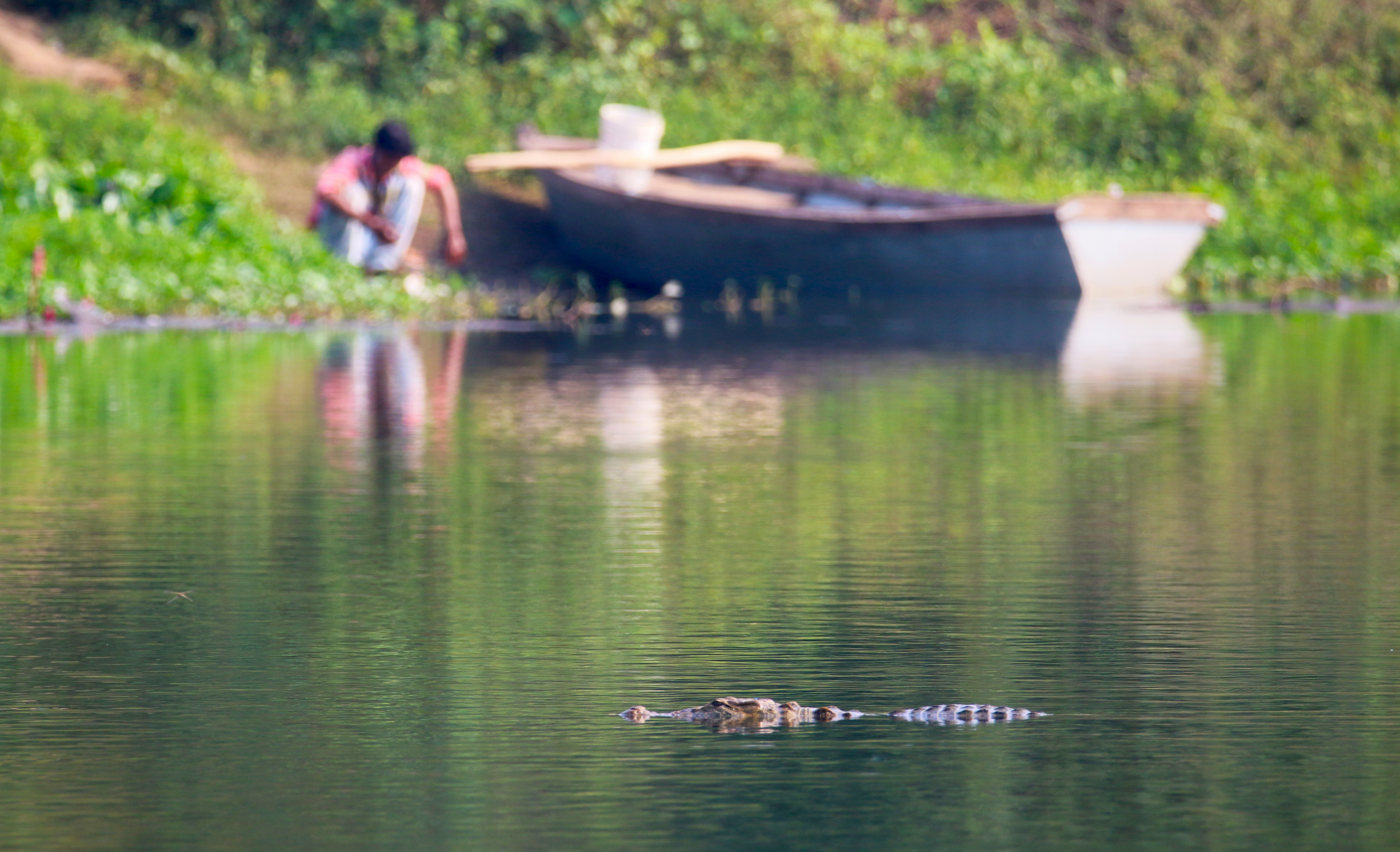
An example of humans and mugger crocodiles in the same environment

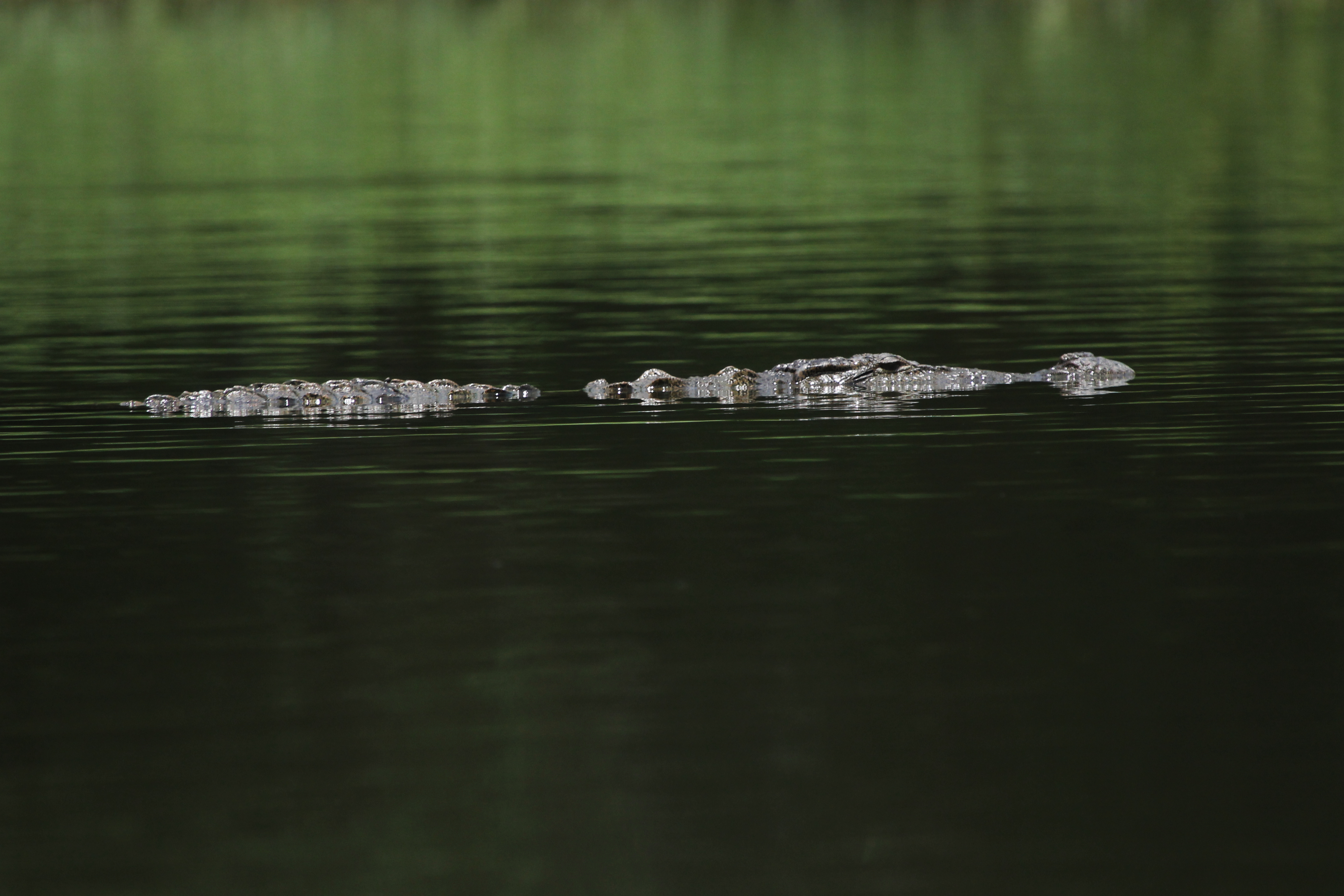
Even a cruising crocodile is difficult to locate

Crocodiles are ambush predators, waiting for fish or land animals to come close, then rushing out to attack. Crocodiles mostly eat fish, amphibians, crustaceans, molluscs, birds, reptiles, and mammals, and they occasionally cannibalize smaller crocodiles. What a crocodile eats varies greatly with species, size and age. From the mostly fish-eating species, like the slender-snouted and freshwater crocodiles, to the larger species like the Nile crocodile and the saltwater crocodile that prey on large mammals, such as buffalo, deer and wild boar, diet shows great diversity. Diet is also greatly affected by the size and age of the individual within the same species. All young crocodiles hunt mostly invertebrates and small fish, gradually moving on to larger prey. Being ectothermic (cold-blooded) predators, they have a very slow metabolism, so they can survive long periods without food. Despite their appearance of being slow, crocodiles have a very fast strike and are top predators in their environment, and various species have been observed attacking and killing other predators such as sharks and big cats. Crocodiles are also known to be aggressive scavengers who feed upon carrion and steal from other predators. Evidence suggests that crocodiles also feed upon fruits, based on the discovery of seeds in stools and stomachs from many subjects as well as accounts of them feeding.

Crocodiles have the most acidic stomach of any vertebrate. They can easily digest bones, hooves and horns. The BBC TV reported that a Nile crocodile that has lurked a long time underwater to catch prey builds up a large oxygen debt. When it has caught and eaten that prey, it closes its right aortic arch and uses its left aortic arch to flush blood loaded with carbon dioxide from its muscles directly to its stomach; the resulting excess acidity in its blood supply makes it much easier for the stomach lining to secrete more stomach acid to quickly dissolve bulks of swallowed prey flesh and bone. Many large crocodilians swallow stones (called gastroliths or stomach stones), which may act as ballast to balance their bodies or assist in crushing food, similar to grit ingested by birds. Herodotus claimed that Nile crocodiles had a symbiotic relationship with certain birds, such as the Egyptian plover, which enter the crocodile's mouth and pick leeches feeding on the crocodile's blood; with no evidence of this interaction actually occurring in any crocodile species, it is most likely mythical or allegorical fiction.

==== Bite ====
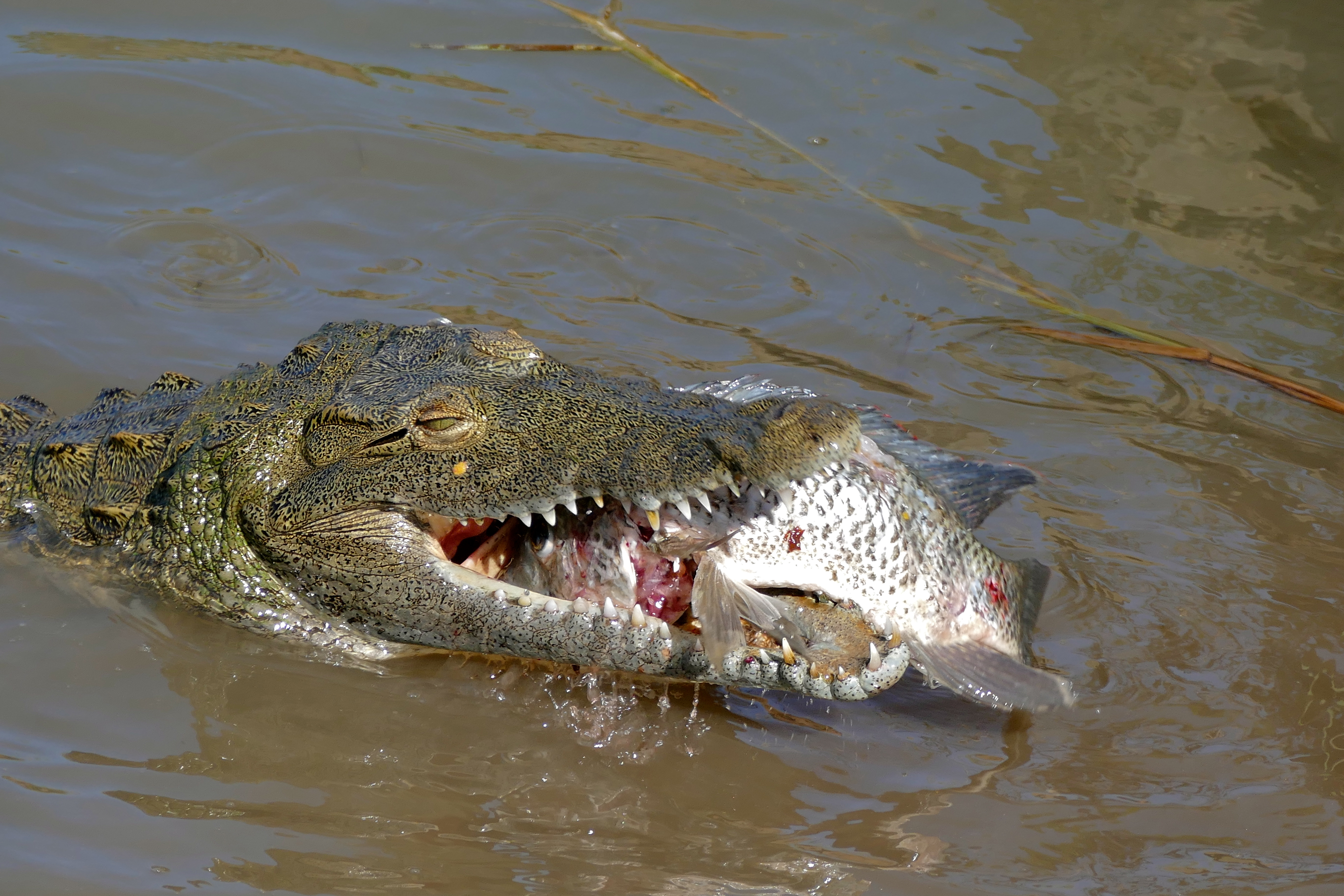
Nile crocodile trying to swallow a big Tilapia in Kruger National Park, South Africa

Since they feed by grabbing and holding onto their prey, they have evolved sharp teeth for piercing and holding onto flesh, and powerful muscles to close the jaws and hold them shut. The teeth are not well-suited to tearing flesh off of large prey items as are the dentition and claws of many mammalian carnivores, the hooked bills and talons of raptorial birds, or the serrated teeth of sharks. However, this is an advantage rather than a disadvantage to the crocodile since the properties of the teeth allow it to hold onto prey with the least possibility of the prey animal escaping. Cutting teeth, combined with the exceptionally high bite force, would pass through flesh easily enough to leave an escape opportunity for prey. The jaws can bite down with immense force, by far the strongest bite of any animal. The force of a large crocodile's bite is more than 5,000 lbf (22,000 N), which was measured in a 5.5 m (18 ft) Nile crocodile, in the field; comparing to 335 lbf (1,490 N) for a Rottweiler, 800 lbf (3,600 N) for a hyena, 2,200 lbf (9,800 N) for an American alligator, and 4,095 lbf (18,220 N) for the largest confirmed great white shark.

A 4.59 m (15.1 ft) long saltwater crocodile has been confirmed as having the strongest bite force ever recorded for an animal in a laboratory setting. It was able to apply a bite force value of 3,690 lbf (16,400 N), and thus surpassed the previous record of 2,125 lbf (9,450 N) made by a 3.9 m (13 ft) long American alligator. Based on regression of mean body mass versus mean bite force, the bite force of a 6.7 m (22 ft) saltwater crocodile with an estimated mass of 1,308 kg (2,884 lb) was estimated at between 6,187 lbf (27,520 N) and 7,736 lbf (34,410 N). The study, led by Dr. Gregory M. Erickson, also shed light on the larger, extinct species of crocodilians. Since crocodile anatomy has barely changed over the last 200 million years, current data on modern crocodilians can be used to estimate the bite force of extinct species. An 11-to-12-metre (36–39 ft) Deinosuchus would apply a force of 23,100 lbf (103,000 N), nearly twice that of the latest, higher bite force estimations of Tyrannosaurus (12,814 lbf (57,000 N)). The extraordinary bite of crocodilians is a result of their anatomy. The space for the jaw muscle in the skull is very large, which is easily visible from the outside as a bulge at each side. The muscle is so stiff, it is almost as hard as bone to touch, as if it were the continuum of the skull. Another trait is that most of the muscle in a crocodile's jaw is arranged for clamping down. Despite the strong muscles to close the jaw, crocodiles have extremely small and weak muscles to open the jaw. Crocodiles can thus be subdued for study or transport by taping their jaws or holding their jaws shut with large rubber bands cut from automobile inner tubes.

=== Locomotion ===
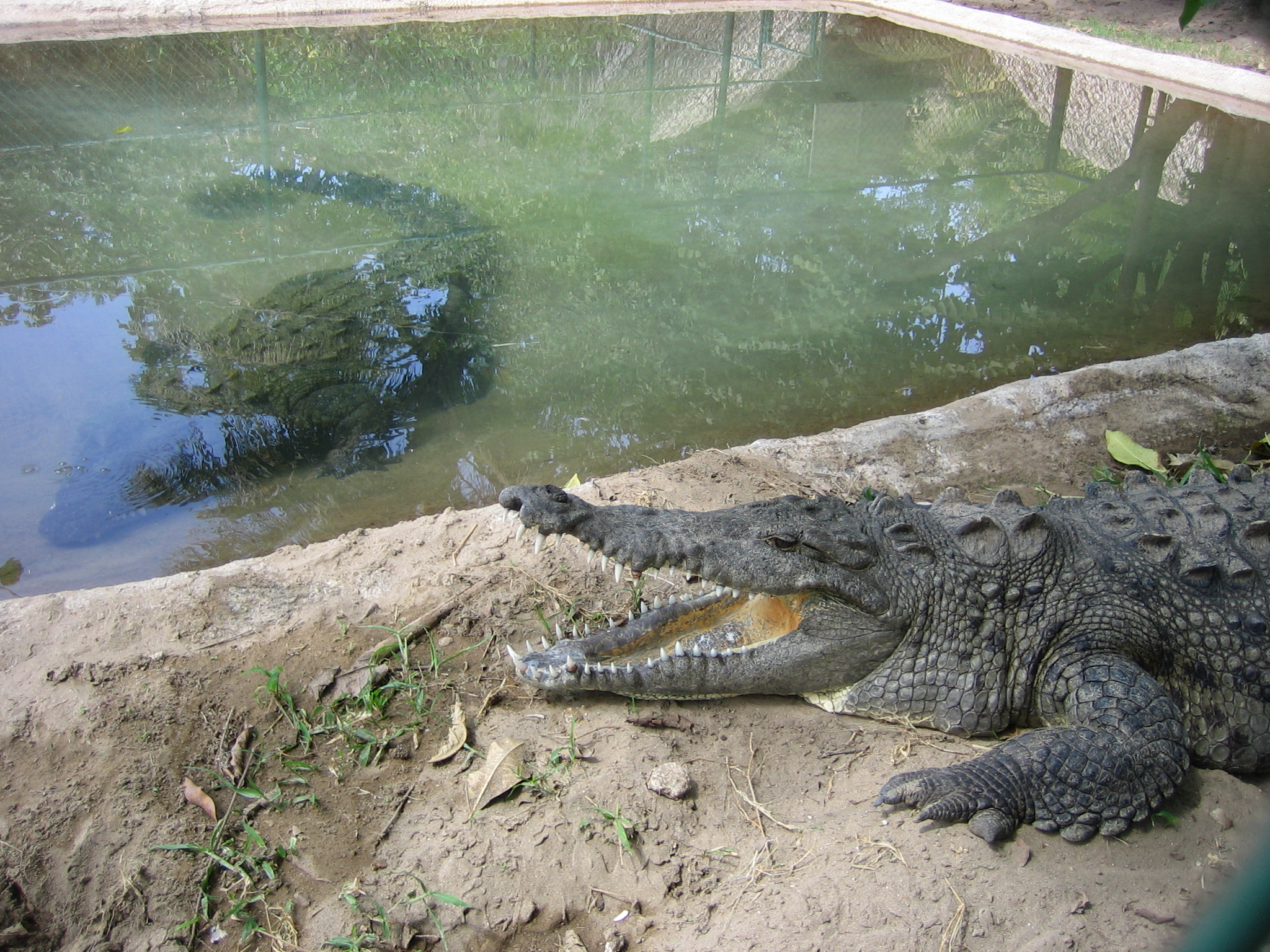
A crocodile, in a farm, gaping to thermoregulate

Crocodiles can move quickly over short distances, even out of water. The land speed record for a crocodile is 17 km/h (11 mph) measured in a galloping Australian freshwater crocodile. Maximum speed varies between species. Some species can gallop, including Cuban crocodiles, Johnston's crocodiles, New Guinea crocodiles, African dwarf crocodiles, and even small Nile crocodiles. The fastest means by which most species can move is a "belly run", in which the body moves in a snake-like (sinusoidal) fashion, limbs splayed out to either side paddling away frantically while the tail whips to and fro. Crocodiles can reach speeds of 10–11 km/h (6–7 mph) when they "belly run", and often faster if slipping down muddy riverbanks. When a crocodile walks quickly, it holds its legs in a straighter and more upright position under its body, which is called the "high walk". This walk allows a speed of up to 5 km/h.

Crocodiles may possess a homing instinct. In northern Australia, three rogue saltwater crocodiles were relocated 400 km (249 mi) by helicopter, but returned to their original locations within three weeks, based on data obtained from tracking devices attached to them.

=== Longevity ===
Measuring crocodile age is unreliable, although several techniques are used to derive a reasonable guess. The most common method is to measure lamellar growth rings in bones and teeth—each ring corresponds to a change in growth rate which typically occurs once a year between dry and wet seasons. Bearing these inaccuracies in mind, it can be safely said that all crocodile species have an average lifespan of at least 30–40 years, and in the case of larger species an average of 60–70 years. The oldest crocodiles appear to be the largest species. C. porosus is estimated to live around 70 years on average, with limited evidence of some individuals exceeding 100 years.

In captivity, some individuals are claimed to have lived for over a century. A male crocodile lived to an estimated age of 110–115 years in a Russian zoo in Yekaterinburg. Named Kolya, he joined the zoo around 1913 to 1915, fully grown, after touring in an animal show, and lived until 1995. A male freshwater crocodile lived to an estimated age of 120–140 years at the Australia Zoo. Known affectionately as "Mr. Freshie", he was rescued around 1970 by Bob Irwin and Steve Irwin, after being shot twice by hunters and losing an eye as a result, and lived until 2010. Crocworld Conservation Centre, in Scottburgh, South Africa, claims to have a male Nile crocodile that was born in 1900. Named Henry, the crocodile is said to have lived in Botswana along the Okavango River, according to centre director Martin Rodrigues.

=== Social behavior and vocalisation ===
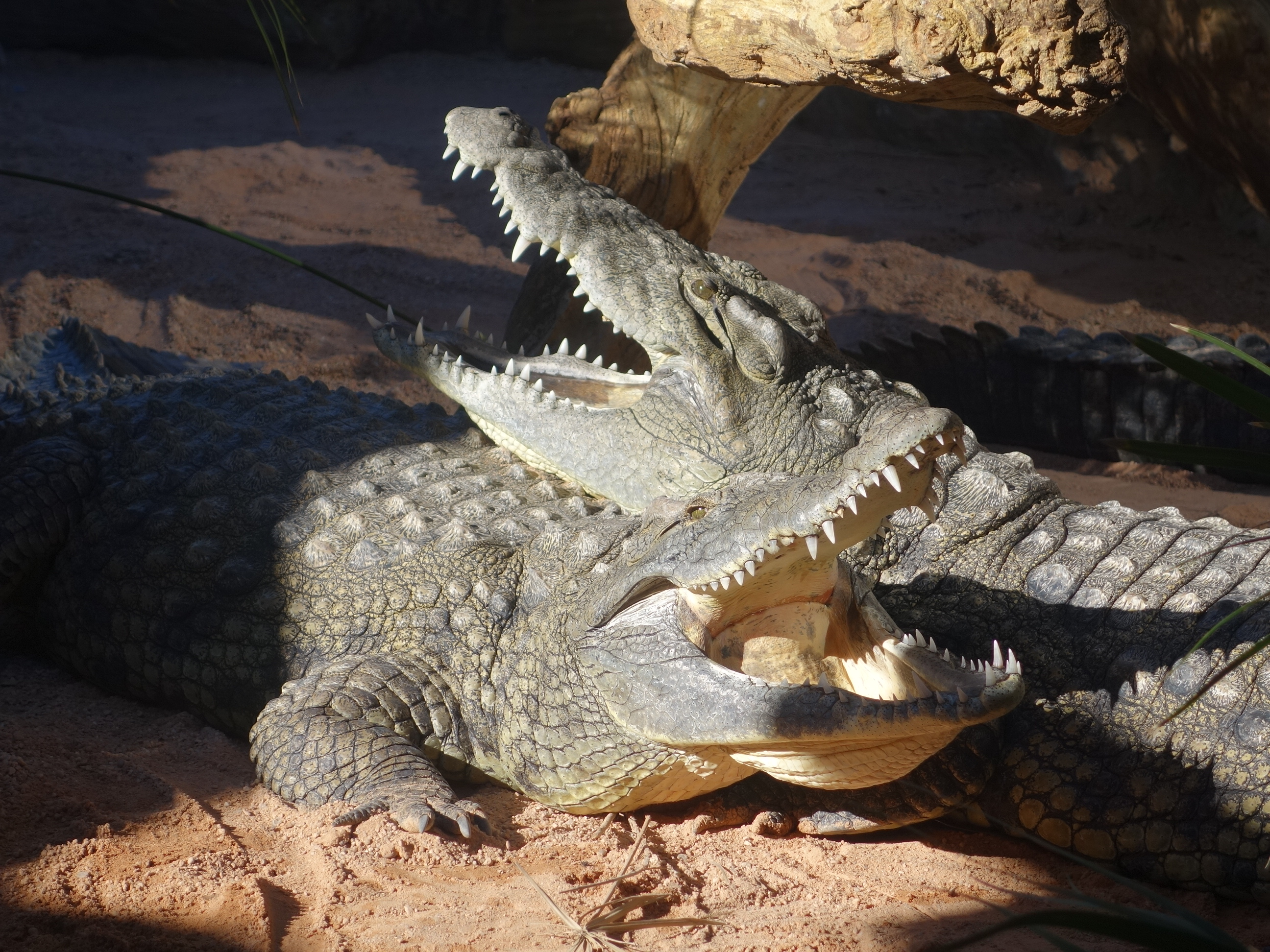
Captive crocodiles resting together with open jaws.

Crocodiles are the most social of reptiles. Even though they do not form social groups, many species congregate in certain sections of rivers, tolerating each other at times of feeding and basking. Most species are not highly territorial, with the exception of the saltwater crocodile, which is a highly territorial and aggressive species: a mature, male saltwater crocodile will not tolerate any other males at any time of the year, but most other species are more flexible. There is a certain form of hierarchy in crocodiles: the largest and heaviest males are at the top, having access to the best basking site, while females are priority during a group feeding of a big kill or carcass. A good example of the hierarchy in crocodiles would be the case of the Nile crocodile. This species clearly displays all of these behaviors. Studies in this area are not thorough, however, and many species are yet to be studied in greater detail. Mugger crocodiles are also known to show toleration in group feedings and tend to congregate in certain areas. However, males of all species are aggressive towards each other during mating season, to gain access to females.

Crocodilians are the most vocal of all reptiles, producing a wide variety of sounds depending on species, age, size and sex. Depending on the context, some species can communicate over 20 different messages through vocalisations alone. Some of these vocalisations are made during social communication, especially during territorial displays towards the same sex and courtship with the opposite sex; the common concern being reproduction. Therefore most conspecific vocalisation is made during the breeding season, with the exception being year-round territorial behaviour in some species and quarrels during feeding. Crocodiles also produce different distress calls and in aggressive displays to their own kind and other animals; notably other predators during interspecific predatory confrontations over carcasses and terrestrial kills.

Specific vocalisations include —

- Chirp: When about to hatch, the young make a "peeping" noise, which encourages the female to excavate the nest. The female then gathers the hatchlings in her mouth and transports them to the water, where they remain in a group for several months, protected by the female
- Distress call: A high-pitched call used mostly by younger animals to alert other crocodiles to imminent danger or an animal being attacked.
- Threat call: A hissing sound that has also been described as a coughing noise.
- Hatching call: Emitted by a female when breeding to alert other crocodiles that she has laid eggs in her nest.
- Bellowing: Male crocodiles are especially vociferous. Bellowing choruses occur most often in the spring when breeding groups congregate, but can occur at any time of year. To bellow, males noticeably inflate as they raise the tail and head out of water, slowly waving the tail back and forth. They then puff out the throat and with a closed mouth, begin to vibrate air. Just before bellowing, males project an infrasonic signal at about 10 Hz through the water, which vibrates the ground and nearby objects. These low-frequency vibrations travel great distances through both air and water to advertise the male's presence and are so powerful they result in the water's appearing to "dance".

=== Reproduction ===
==== Mating ====
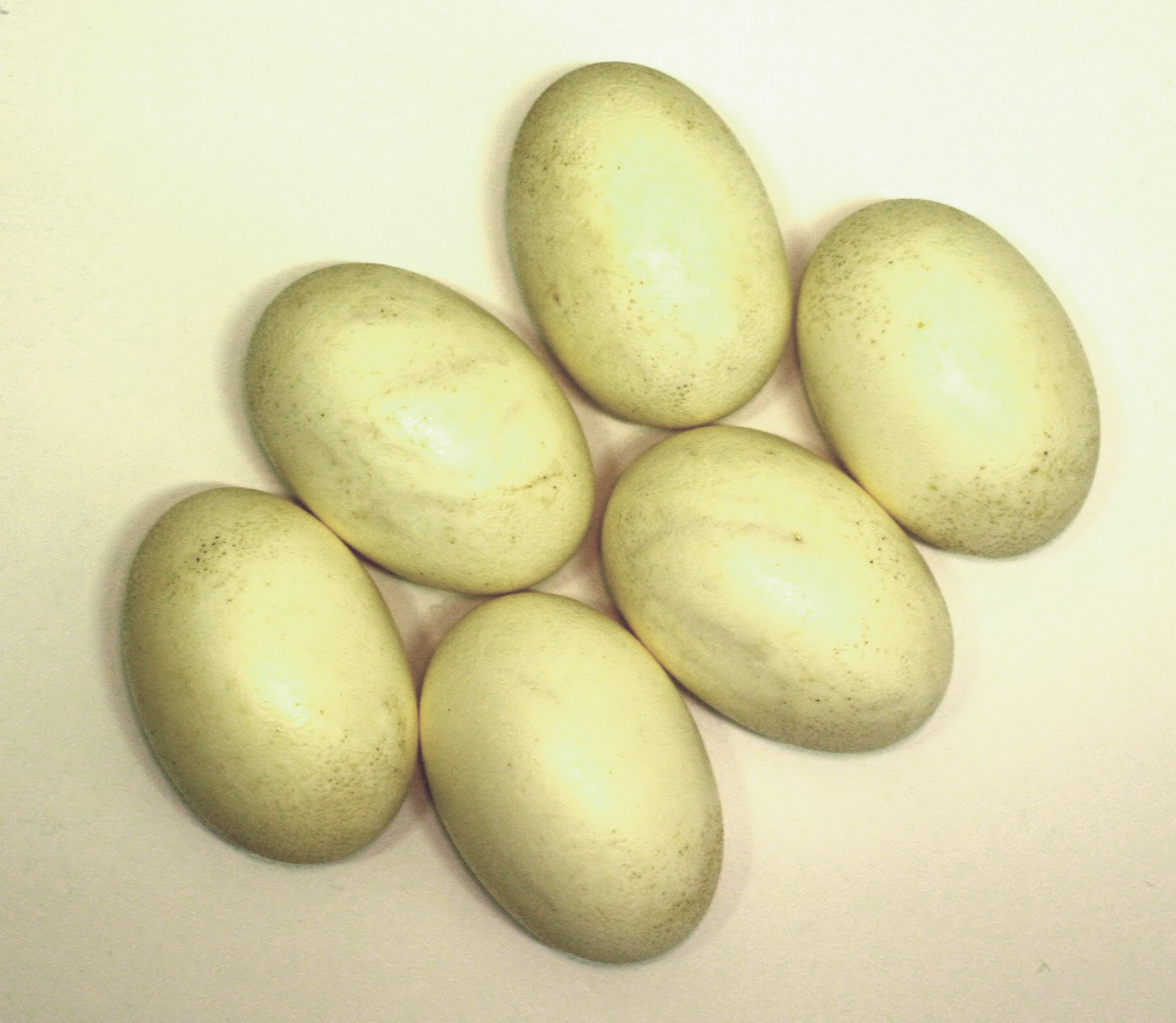
Crocodile eggs

Courtship takes place in a series of behavioural interactions that include a variety of snout rubbing and submissive display that can take a long time. Mating always takes place in water, where the pair can be observed mating several times.

==== Egg-laying & nesting ====
Egg-laying usually takes place at night and about 30–40 minutes, which are laid in either holes or mound nests, depending on species. The eggs are hard shelled, but translucent at the time of egg-laying. Depending on the species of crocodile, 7 to 95 eggs are laid. Scutes may play a role in calcium storage for eggshell formation.

Nesting periods range from a few weeks up to six months. A hole nest is usually excavated in sand and a mound nest is usually constructed out of vegetation. Females can build or dig several trial nests which appear incomplete and abandoned later. Females are highly protective of their nests and young. Crocodile embryos do not have sex chromosomes, and unlike humans, sex is not determined genetically. Sex is determined by temperature, where at 30 °C (86 °F) or less most hatchlings are females and at 31 °C (88 °F), offspring are of both sexes. A temperature of 32 to 33 °C (90 to 91 °F) gives mostly males whereas above 33 °C (91 °F) in some species continues to give males, but in other species resulting in females, which are sometimes called high-temperature females. Temperature also affects growth and survival rate of the young, which may explain the sexual dimorphism in crocodiles. The average incubation period is around 80 days, and also is dependent on temperature and species that usually ranges from 65 to 95 days. The eggshell structure is very conservative through evolution but there are enough changes to tell different species apart by their eggshell microstructure.

At the time of hatching, the young start calling within the eggs. Hearing the calls, the female usually excavates the nest and sometimes takes the unhatched eggs in her mouth, slowly rolling the eggs to help the process. The young have an egg-tooth at the tip of their snouts, which is developed from the skin, and that helps them pierce out of the shell. Once hatched, the young are usually carried to the water in the female's mouth. She will then introduce her hatchlings to the water and even feed them. The mother takes care of her young for over a year before the next mating season. In the absence of the mother crocodile, the father will act in her place to take care of the young. However, even with sophisticated parental nurturing, young crocodiles have a very high mortality rate due to their vulnerability to predation. A group of hatchlings is called a pod or crèche.

=== Cognition ===
Crocodiles possess some advanced cognitive abilities. Crocodiles cooperatively hunt. Large numbers of crocodiles swim in circles to trap fish and take turns snatching them. In hunting larger prey, crocodiles swarm in, with one holding the prey down as the others rip it apart.

Vladimir Dinets of the University of Tennessee, observing crocodile's use of twigs as bait was inconclusive.

== Relationship with humans ==
=== Danger to humans ===
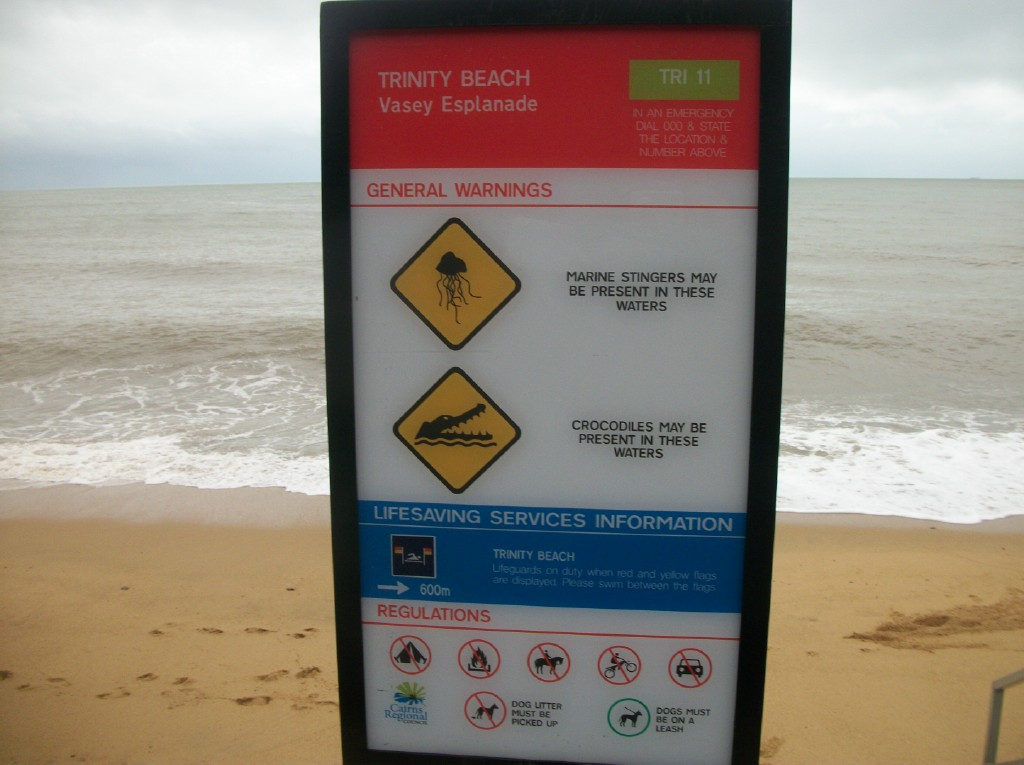
Crocodile warning sign, Trinity Beach, Queensland, Australia

The larger species of crocodiles are very dangerous to humans, mainly because of their ability to strike before the person can react. The saltwater crocodile and Nile crocodile are the most dangerous, killing hundreds of people each year in parts of Southeast Asia and Africa. The mugger crocodile and American crocodile are also dangerous to humans.

=== Crocodile products ===
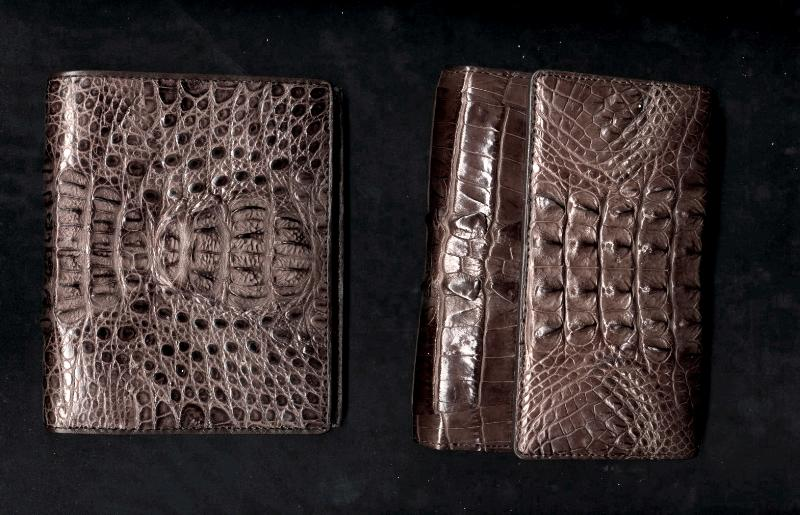
Crocodile leather wallets from a Bangkok crocodile farm

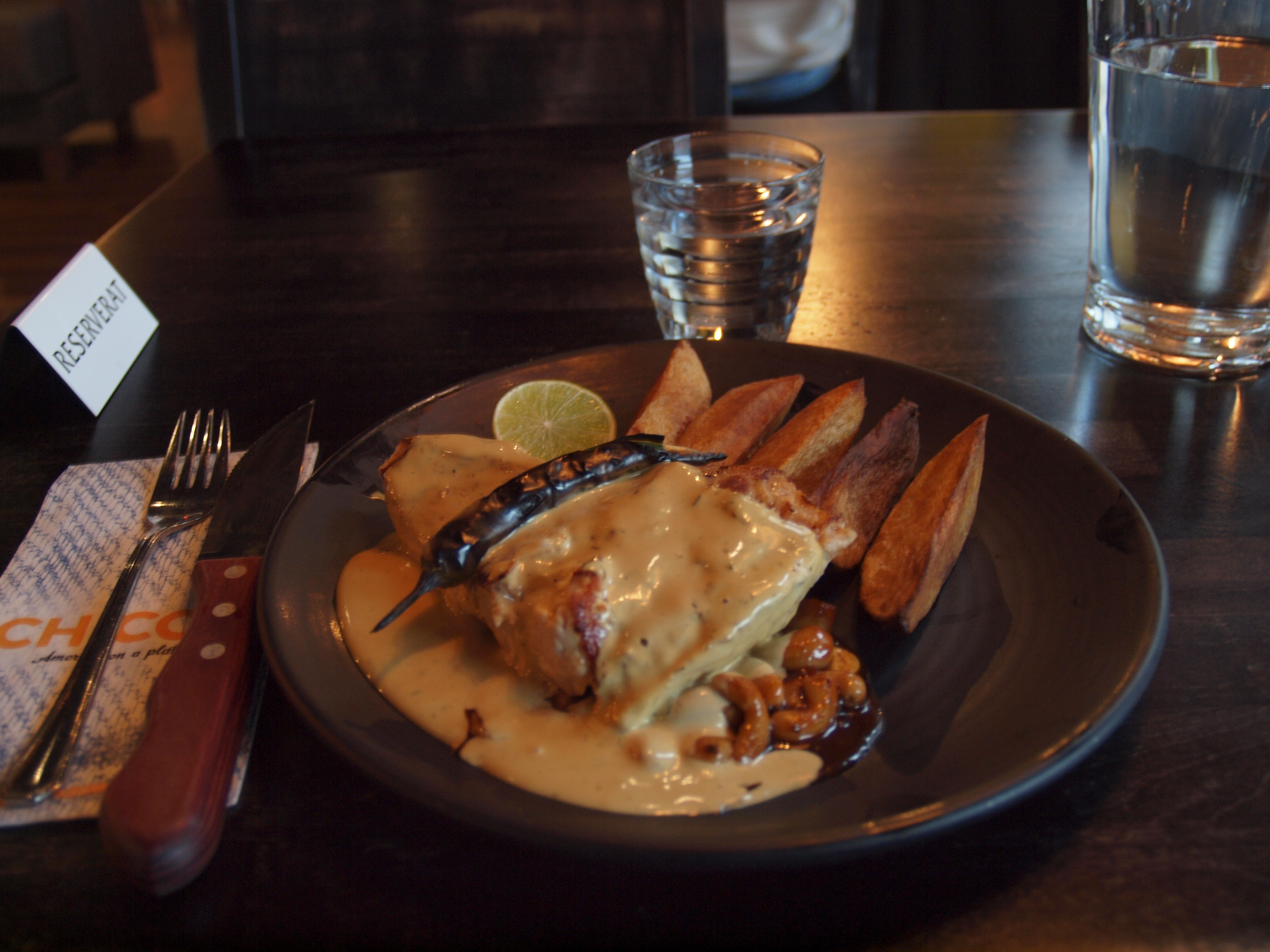
A plate of crocodile meat in teriyaki sauce in Helsinki, Finland

Crocodiles are protected in many parts of the world, but are also farmed commercially. Their hides are tanned and used to make leather goods such as shoes and handbags; crocodile meat is also considered a delicacy. The most commonly farmed species are the saltwater and Nile crocodiles, while a hybrid of the saltwater and the rare Siamese crocodile is also bred in Asian farms. Farming has resulted in an increase in the saltwater crocodile population in Australia, as eggs are usually harvested from the wild, so landowners have an incentive to conserve their habitat. Crocodile leather can be made into goods such as wallets, briefcases, purses, handbags, belts, hats, and shoes. Crocodile oil has been used for various purposes. Crocodiles were eaten by Vietnamese while they were taboo and off limits for Chinese. Vietnamese women who married Chinese men adopted the Chinese taboo.

Crocodile meat is consumed in some countries, such as Australia, Ethiopia, Thailand, South Africa, China, and Cuba (in pickled form). It is also occasionally eaten as an "exotic" delicacy in the western world. Cuts of meat include backstrap and tail fillet.

Due to high demand for crocodile products, TRAFFIC states that 1,418,487 Nile Crocodile skins were exported from Africa between 2006 and 2015.

=== Crocodile hunting and conservation ===
Aboriginal Australians harvested eggs and hunted crocodiles in a sustainable way for many thousands of years. The Brinkin people (aka Marrithiyal) of the Daly River in the Northern Territory (NT) used harpoons and bamboo, and even their own hands to capture crocodiles for food. After settlement of northern Australia, in the late-19th and early 20th centuries, non-Indigenous people killed individual crocodiles, mostly by locals to protect the population, or novelty-seeking visitors, or just opportunistically, so numbers were not noticeably reduced. From the 1930s, commercial hunting began, with Aboriginal people often employed to kill the crocodiles using traditional methods. From the 1940s to the 1960s, hunting began on a larger scale using .303 rifles. They were hunted for leather, with the skins shipped to plants in capital cities. Western Australia banned hunting freshwater crocodiles in 1962 and saltwater crocodiles in 1970, while NT bans were brought in 1964 and 1971; Queensland did not pass such legislation. The federal government later banned the export of crocodile skins, which brought commercial hunting to an end in Queensland. They have been a protected species since the 1970s, when numbers were down to approximately 3,000 in the NT at the lowest estimate. In 2021, after several attacks on humans by the "salties" and an estimated population of around 200,000 had been reached, Queensland politician Bob Katter called for the reintroduction of hunting.

=== In religion and mythology ===
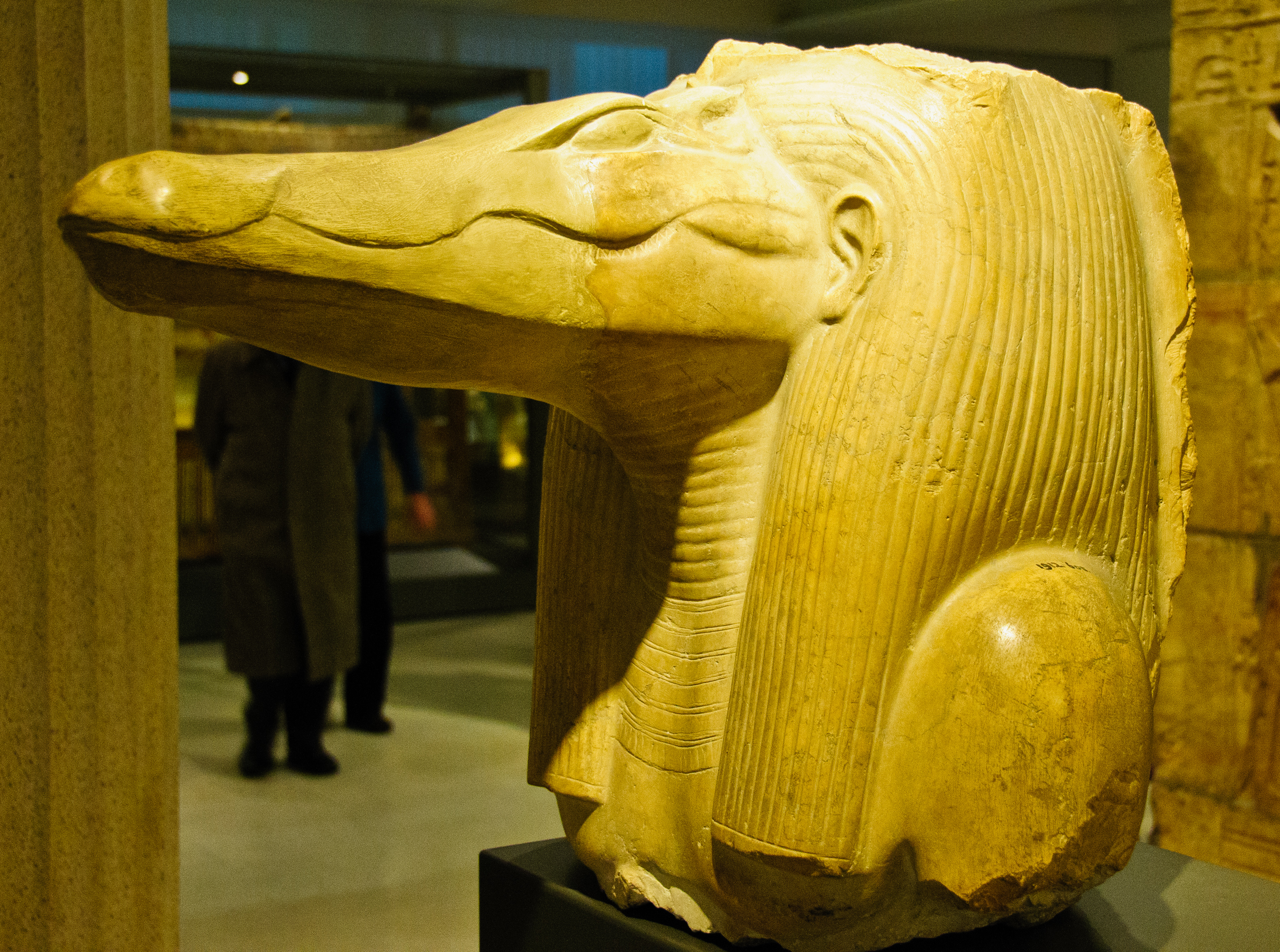
Statue of Sobek from the mortuary temple of Amenemhat III c. 1810 BC. Ashmolean Museum, Oxford.

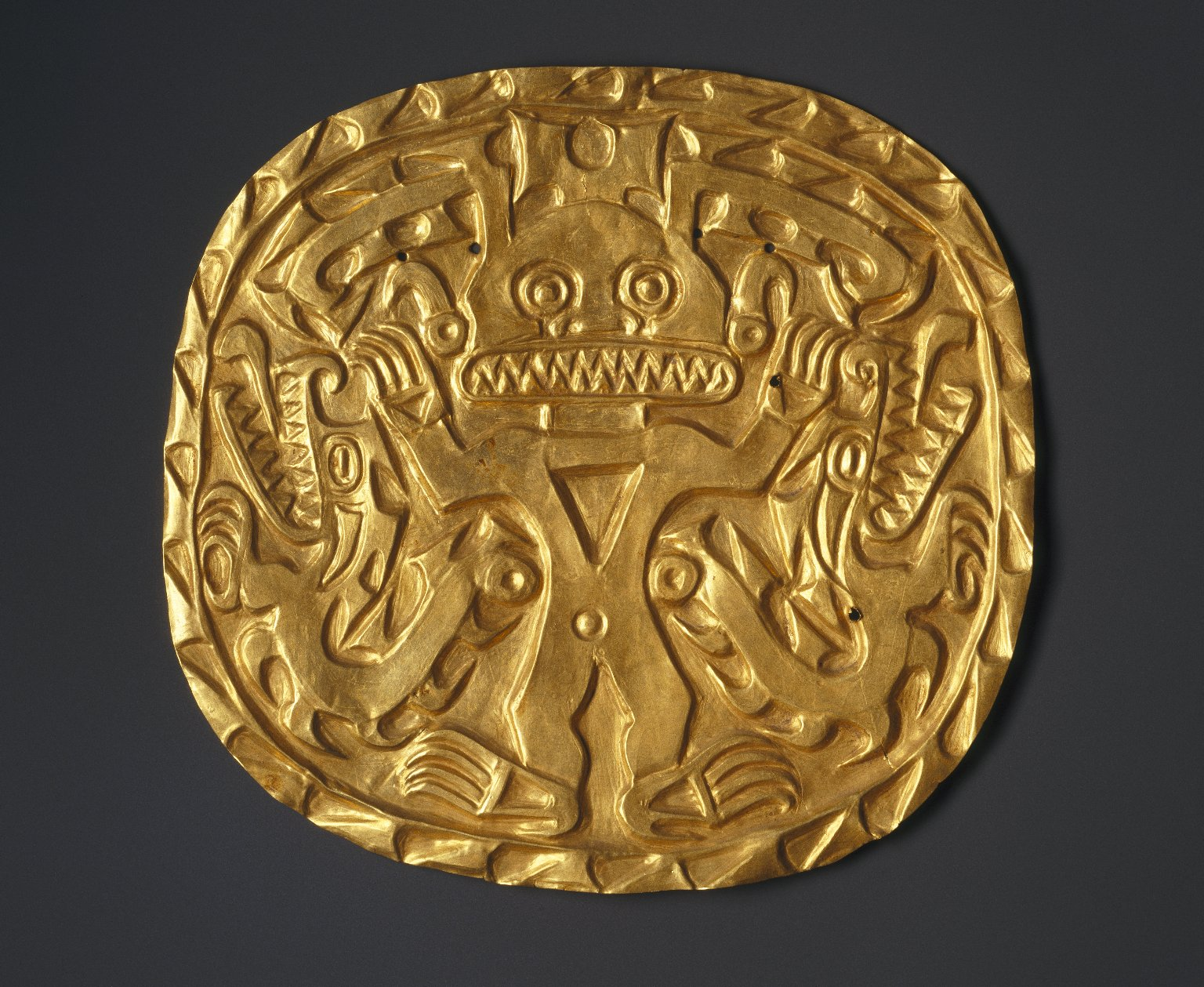
Brooklyn Museum – Plaque from Cocle, Panama, with Crocodile Deity, ca. 700–900.,33.448.12

Crocodiles have appeared in various forms in religions across the world. Ancient Egypt had Sobek, the crocodile-headed god, with his cult-city Crocodilopolis, as well as Taweret, the goddess of childbirth and fertility, with the back and tail of a crocodile. The Jukun shrine in the Wukari Federation, Nigeria is dedicated to crocodiles in thanks for their aid during migration. In Madagascar various peoples such as the Sakalava and Antandroy see crocodiles as ancestor spirits and under local fady often offer them food; in the case of the latter at least a crocodile features prominently as an ancestor deity.

Crocodiles appear in different forms in Hinduism. Varuna, a Vedic and Hindu god, rides a part-crocodile makara; his consort Varuni rides a crocodile. Similarly the goddess personifications of the Ganga and Yamuna rivers are often depicted as riding crocodiles. Also in India, in Goa, crocodile worship is practised, including the annual Mannge Thapnee ceremony.

Sikh warriors known as nihang also have connections with crocodiles. Nihang may come from the Persian word for a mythical sea creature (Persian: نهنگ). The term owes its origin to Mughal historians, who compared the ferocity of the Akali with that of crocodiles. In Sikhism however, Akali refers to the immortal army of Akal (god).

In Latin America, Cipactli was the giant earth crocodile of the Aztec and other Nahua peoples.

Fighting shark and crocodile, the emblem of Surabaya

The name of Surabaya, Indonesia, is locally believed to be derived from the words "suro" (shark) and "boyo" (crocodile), two creatures which, in a local myth, fought each other in order to gain the title of "the strongest and most powerful animal" in the area. It was said that the two powerful animals agreed for a truce and set boundaries; that the shark's domain would be in the sea while the crocodile's domain would be on the land. However one day the shark swam into the river estuary to hunt; this angered the crocodile, who declared it his territory. The Shark argued that the river was a water-realm which meant that it was shark territory, while the crocodile argued that the river flowed deep inland, so it was therefore crocodile territory. The two animals bit each other and a ferocious fight ensued. Finally the shark, badly bitten, fled to the open sea, and in the end the crocodile ruled the estuarine area that today is the city. Another source alludes to a Jayabaya prophecy—a 12th-century psychic king of Kediri Kingdom—as he foresaw a fight between a giant white shark and a giant white crocodile taking place in the area. This is sometimes interpreted as a foretelling of the Mongol invasion of Java, a major conflict between the forces of the Kublai Khan, Mongol ruler of China, and those of Raden Wijaya's Majapahit in 1293. The two animals are now used as the city's symbol, with the two facing and circling each other, as depicted in a statue appropriately located near the entrance to the city zoo (see photo on the Surabaya page).

=== In language and as symbols ===
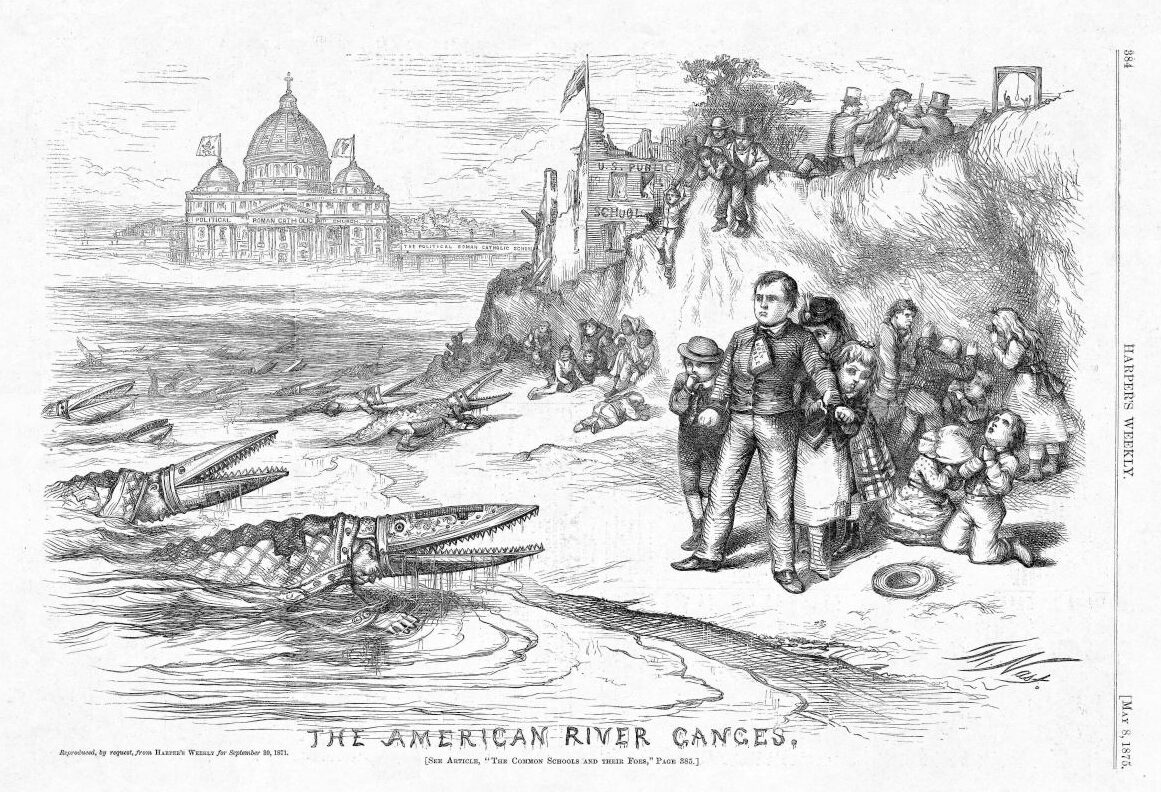
1876 U.S. cartoon by Thomas Nast depicting Roman Catholic bishops as crocodiles attacking public schools, with the connivance of Irish Catholic politicians

The term "crocodile tears" (and equivalents in other languages) refers to a false, insincere display of emotion, such as a hypocrite crying fake tears of grief. It is derived from an ancient anecdote that crocodiles weep in order to lure their prey, or that they cry for the victims they are eating, first told in the Bibliotheca by Photios I of Constantinople. The story is repeated in bestiaries such as De bestiis et aliis rebus. This tale was first spread widely in English in the stories of the Travels of Sir John Mandeville in the 14th century, and appears in several of Shakespeare's plays. In fact, crocodiles can and do generate tears, but they do not actually cry.

In the UK, a row of schoolchildren walking in pairs, or two by two is known as "crocodile".

In politics, a crocodile has been used in different countries to describe politicians and political groups, sometimes as a compliment for a leader seen as strong and strategic, while in others it is a negative label linked to corruption, greed, or predatory behavior.

=== Fashion logos ===
The French clothing company Lacoste features a crocodile in its logo. The American shoe company Crocs also uses this imagery in its logo.

== See also ==
- The Crocodile Hunter
- Crocodilian armor
- Sobek – an ancient Egyptian deity associated with the Nile crocodile
