= Vladimir Dinets =

American zoologist

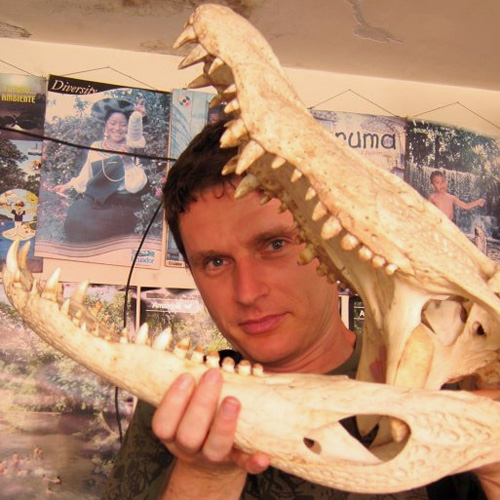
- Vladimir Dinets with a skull of a black caiman, Puerto Francisco de Orellana, Ecuador.
- Born: Moscow, Russia
- Education: MIREA; University of Miami
- Scientific career
- Fields: Zoology; Ethology; Conservation Biology; Behavioral Ecology
- Workplaces: Okinawa Institute of Science and Technology; University of Tennessee; Louisiana State University; Rutgers University
- Doctoral advisor: Steven Green

Vladimir Dinets is an American zoologist known for his studies of Crocodilian behavior and of numerous rare animals in remote parts of the world, as well as for popular writings in English and Russian.

== Education ==
Dinets was interested in zoology from an early age, and was a winner of all-USSR Student Biology Olympics at Moscow State University. However, due to his Jewish ancestry, he was unofficially banned from entering that university, and obtained a master's degree in biological engineering from Moscow State Institute of Radio-engineering Electronics and Automation. Being strongly opposed to First Chechen War, Dinets emigrated to the United States in 1997, and in 2011 obtained a PhD from University of Miami (adviser Steven Green). Dinets maintained a popular bilingual blog on LiveJournal, mostly defunct since the 2014 onset of Russo-Ukrainian War, which caused him to cut off his ties with Russia, and has a website with a number of illustrated essays on biology, conservation and travel.

== Work ==
- Dinets' early zoological studies were conducted in remote areas of the USSR, China and South America; he also participated in a number of conservation projects in Russia, Mongolia, Israel and Peru. In 1992 he solved the mystery of the ability of rock ptarmigans to winter on Arctic islands in total darkness: they survive by feeding on rich vegetation on sea cliffs where seabird colonies are located in summer.
- In 1996-1999 Dinets conducted a study of international trade in endangered insects and consulted the governments of Nepal and Sikkim on the issue, providing a set of recommendations for improving anti-poaching and anti-traffic control.
- In 2000-2005 Dinets participated in studies of marine mammals, as well as the natural circulation of plague on the Great Plains (at University of Colorado) and Sin Nombre hantavirus in the American Southwest (at the University of New Mexico). He also conducted a number of solo expeditions in North America, South America, Asia and Africa, and studied a few species of birds and mammals never before observed by scientists, such as bay cat on Borneo, woolly flying squirrel in the mountains of Pakistan, and Cameroon scaly-tail in Central African Republic.
- In 2005-2013 Dinets conducted a comparative study of social behavior of Crocodilians, working in 26 countries. In 2005 he discovered "alligator dances". By 2010 he elucidated the roles of many signals used by Crocodilians, and proposed their possible evolutionary history. In 2009-2013 he documented the ability of crocodiles and alligators to use coordination and role separation during cooperative hunting and to use sticks as lures for hunting birds looking for nesting material. He also conducted the first scientific studies of play behavior in crocodilians and on coordinated hunting in snakes.
- In 2011 Dinets took part in WWF expedition to Vietnam to study saola, and became the first zoologist to find and photograph saola tracks in the wild.
- In 2012-2013 Dinets was a research associate at Louisiana State University, working on whooping crane reintroduction to Louisiana and studying behavioral ecology.
- Since 2011 Dinets is a research assistant professor at the University of Tennessee, where he is studying behavioral ecology and its applications to conservation. He also worked on predicting the effects of possible invasions of brood parasites from Eurasia into North America.
- In 2017-2021 Dinets was a science and technology associate and later a visiting researcher at Okinawa Institute of Science and Technology, working on behavior, ecology and conservation of birds and mammals in Asia. During that time he participated in OKEON Project conducting a long-term study of Okinawa ecosystems, and discovered the first case of permanent endothermy in an invertebrates (semi-sessile lanternflies); that discovery has important implications for paleontology, evolutionary physiology, and invasive species control.
- Since 2022 Dinets is teaching mathematics at Rutgers University., while continuing research on behavioral ecology and conservation.

== Books ==
- In 1993-1997 Dinets wrote a number of books about travel that remain popular in Russia.
- Volumes of Encyclopedia of Russian Nature series, Actual Biology Fund, 26,000 copies published: A. Beme, A. Cherenkov, V. Dinets, V. Flint. Birds of Russia (1995); V. Dinets, E. Rotshild. Mammals of Russia (1997); V. Dinets, E. Rotshild. Domestic Animals, 1998.
- J. Newell (ed.) The Russian Far East: A Reference Guide for Conservation and Development. Daniel & Daniel Publishers (2004).
- V. Dinets. Dragon Songs: Love and Adventure among Crocodiles, Alligators, and Other Dinosaur Relations Arcade Publishing (2013), softcover edition 2021 Arcade Publishing.
- V. Dinets. Peterson Field Guide to Finding Mammals in North America (Peterson Field Guides series) Houghton Mifflin Harcourt (2015).
- V. Dinets. Wildlife Spectacles: Mass Migrations, Mating Rituals, and Other Fascinating Animal Behaviors Timber Press (2016).
- S. M. Doody, V. Dinets, G. Burghardt. The Secret Social Lives of Reptiles Johns Hopkins University Press (2021).
