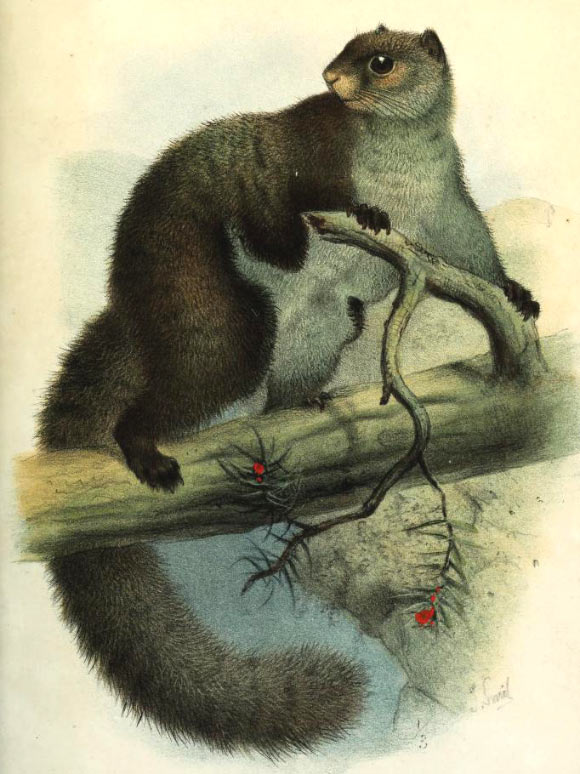
- Eupetaurus cinereus

Scientific classification
- Kingdom: Animalia
- Phylum: Chordata
- Class: Mammalia
- Order: Rodentia
- Family: Sciuridae
- Tribe: Pteromyini
- Genus: Eupetaurus; Thomas, 1888

Type species
- Eupetaurus cinereus

Species
- Eupetaurus cinereus; Eupetaurus nivamons; Eupetaurus tibetensis

= Eupetaurus =

Genus of mammals

Eupetaurus is a genus of rodent in the family Sciuridae. Members of this genus are known as woolly flying squirrels. They are large to very large flying squirrels found in the highest rocky cliffs near the treeline of the Himalayas and Tibetan Plateau. Due to the inaccessibility of their montane habitat, they are difficult to study.

== Taxonomy ==
Flying squirrels in the central and eastern Himalayas have been separated from those in the western Himalayas by the Ganges and Yarlung Tsangpo rivers, and are thought to have diverged in the Neogene, between 4.5 and 10.2 million years ago.

== Species ==
For more than a century since its description by Oldfield Thomas, the only species in the genus was thought to be the western woolly flying squirrel (E. cinereus), which is found in northern Pakistan and northwestern India. However, an analysis of museum specimens found evidence of two more species in the eastern Himalayas, the Tibetan woolly flying squirrel (E. tibetensis) and the Yunnan woolly flying squirrel (E. nivamons).

There are currently three known species in the genus:

- Western woolly flying squirrel (Eupetaurus cinereus)
- Yunnan woolly flying squirrel (Eupetaurus nivamons)
- Tibetan woolly flying squirrel (Eupetaurus tibetensis)

== Description ==
The cheek teeth are unique as they are both flat-crowned and high crowned (hypsodont), setting Eupetaurus apart from other squirrels and suggesting that they feed on very abrasive plant material, including pine needles. This genus possesses the largest cranium among all flying squirrel species and exhibits extreme cranial morphology among them, with features associated to functional demands required for processing its hard, low-nutrient food source. The western woolly flying squirrel has a grizzled-grey pelage with pronounced frosting, in contrast to the more saturated brown coloration of the two other species, and has more robust cusps and cheek teeth.

== Relationships ==
The woolly flying squirrels are unique among the flying squirrels because of their large size and unique dentition. This led a few early researchers to go so far as to create a distinct family. Some of their arguments were based on poorly drawn and labeled diagrams of the cranium and lower jaw of E. cinereus. Zahler and Woods (1997) suggest instead that Eupetaurus is closely related to another genus of large flying squirrels, Petaurista. A 2021 study suggested that Eupetaurus is the sister genus to a clade consisting of Aeromys and Biswamayopterus.
