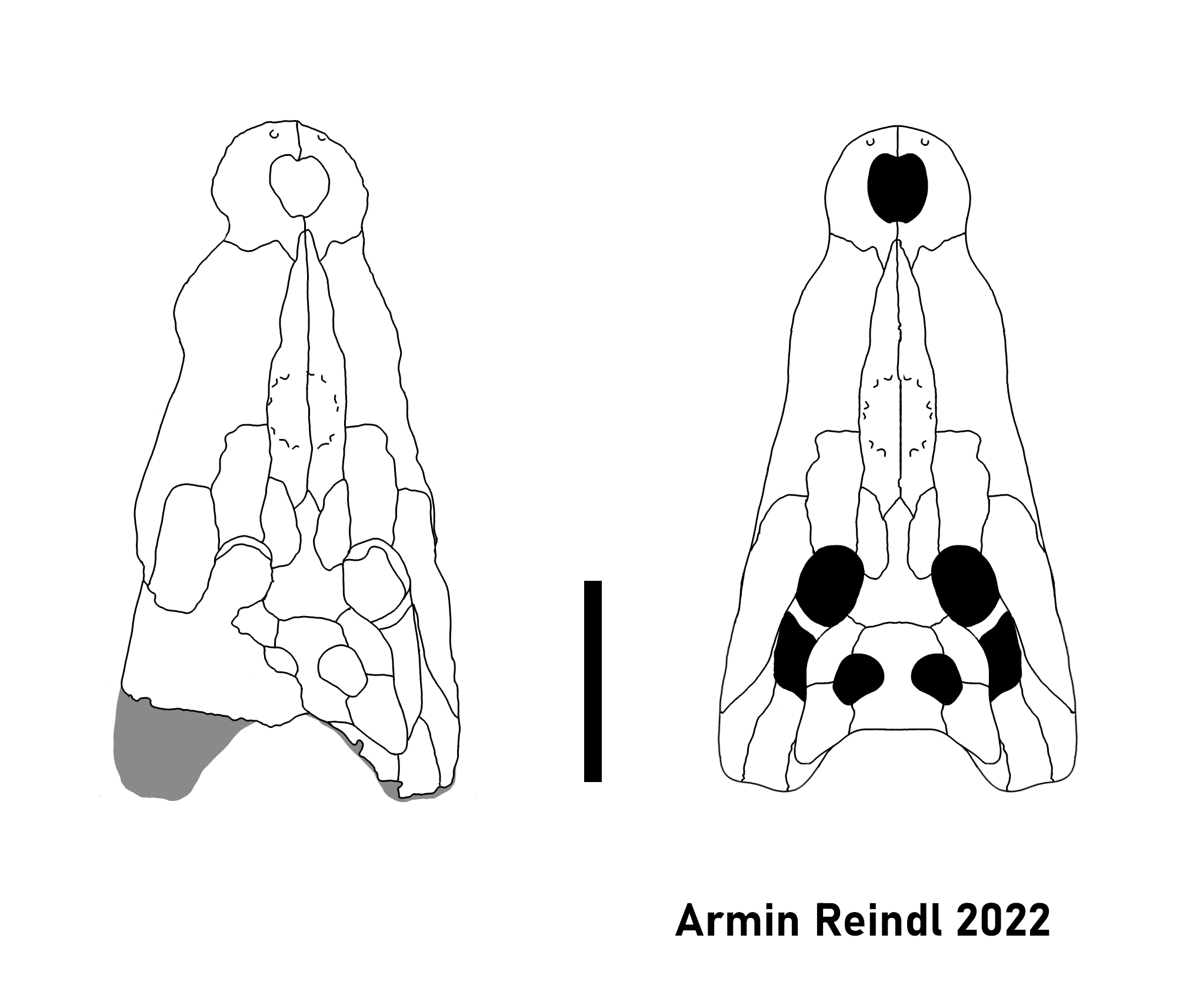

Scientific classification
- Kingdom: Animalia
- Phylum: Chordata
- Class: Reptilia
- Clade: Archosauria
- Order: Crocodilia
- Superfamily: Crocodyloidea
- Family: Crocodylidae
- Genus: Crocodylus
- Species: †C. falconensis

Binomial name
- †Crocodylus falconensis Scheyer et al., 2013

= Crocodylus falconensis =

Crocodylus falconensis Temporal range: Middle Pliocene (Montehermosan-Chapadmalalan) ~5.332–3.6 Ma

Extinct species of reptile

Crocodylus falconensis is an extinct species of crocodile known from the early Pliocene of the lower part of the Vergel Member of the San Gregorio Formation of Venezuela. C. falconensis was named in 2013 after Falcón State and is thought to be the basalmost species of Crocodylus found in the Neotropics.

== Description ==
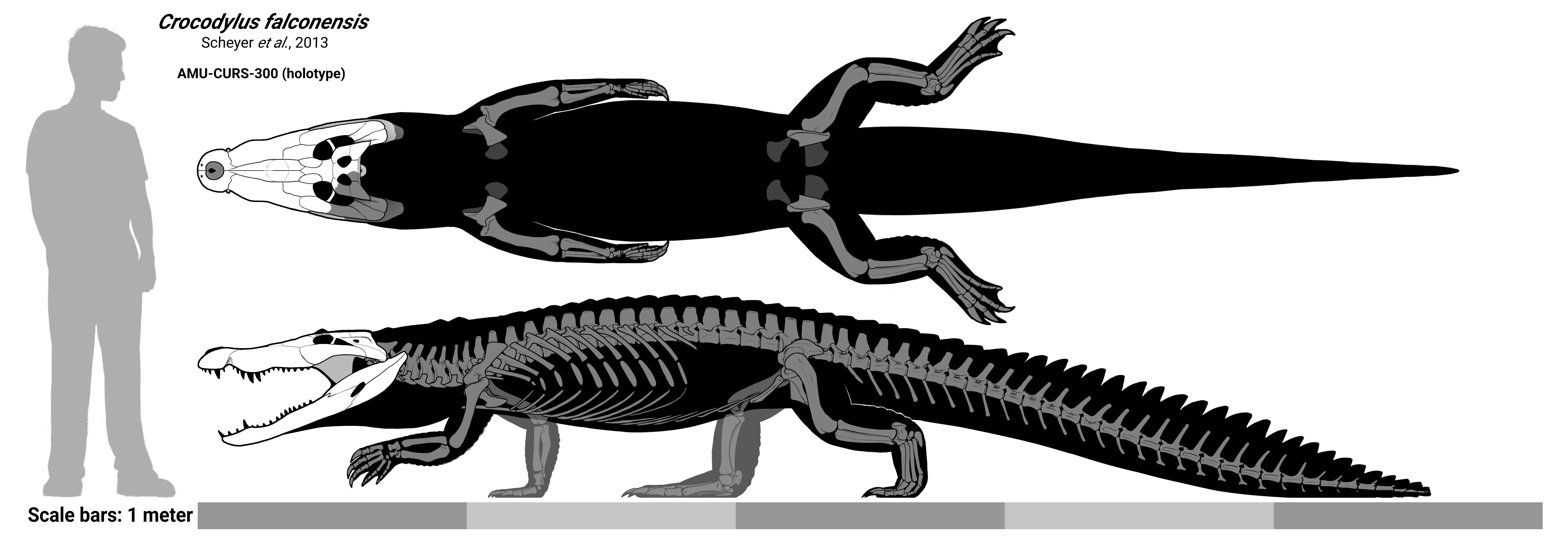
Reconstructed skull and size comparison of the holotype

C. falconensis was a medium-sized species of crocodile with a robust, generalist skull shape. The orbits and the supratemporal fenestrae are notably smaller than those of other Crocodylus species of the same age, while the nares are comparably larger (however still small relative to the overall skull size). The premaxilla surrounds the nares entirely, excluding the nasal bones from contacting them. Another feature differentiation Crocodylus falconensis from other species of the genus is that the supraoccipital reaches or at least almost reaches the foramen magnum. The roughly triangular skull had a prominent notch located behind the nares to receive one of the enlarged dentary teeth and the center of the rostrum housed a prominent bony boss. Such a boss can also be found in the extant species of the Neotropics, including the American Crocodile.

== Evolution ==
Initial phylogenetic analysis by Scheyer and colleagues recovered C. falconensis as the basal-most of New World Crocodylus species and sister taxa to all subsequent species of the Americas. This has been interpreted to mean that C. falconensis was one of, if not the first member of the genus to cross the Atlantic, with all other neotropic Crocodylus species radiating from South America. A study published in mid 2020, which focused on the phylogenetic placement of the African Crocodylus checchiai recovered slightly different results. In their analysis, neotropic Crocodylus species retained their monophyletic status and were still recovered as originating from African species that must have crossed the Atlantic, recovering C. checchiai as the likely Old-World precursor to the American lineage due to their similar morphology, including the prominent dorsal boss. However, their results differ from Scheyer's initial analysis in that despite being the oldest, C. falconensis was not recovered as the basalmost neotropic species (this role was filled by the Orinoco Crocodile in Delfino et al. 2020).

- Crocodylus
  - C. palaeindicus
  - - Indopacific
      - C. palustris
      - - C. siamensis
        - - C. porosus
          - C. mindorensis
          - - C. johnsoni
            - C. novaeguineae
    - Africa‑New World
      - C. niloticus
      - New World
        - C. falconensis
        - - C. moreletii
          - C. rhombifer
          - - C. acutus
            - C. intermedius

- - Crocodylus
    - C. palaeindicus
    - - Indopacific
        - C. palustris
        - - C. siamensis
          - - C. mindorensis
            - - C. porosus
              - - C. johnsoni
                - C. novaeguineae
      - Africa‑New World
        - C. niloticus
        - - C. checchiai
          - - C. intermedius
            - - C. falconensis
              - - C. rhombifer
                - - C. acutus
                  - C. moreletii

In 2021, Hekkala et al. were able to use paleogenomics, extracting DNA from the extinct Voay, to better establish the relationships within Crocodylidae, including the subfamilies Crocodylinae and Osteolaeminae. Their results too recover a close connection between the Miocene C. checchiai of Africa and the Pliocene C. falconensis, placing them as sister taxa. However, these results render the origin of neotropic Crocodylus relatively obscure, as the two species group together at the base of the African-American clade, less derived than either of the two extant African species. Following these results rather than those of Scheyer or Delfino would imply two distinct dispersal events into the Americas.

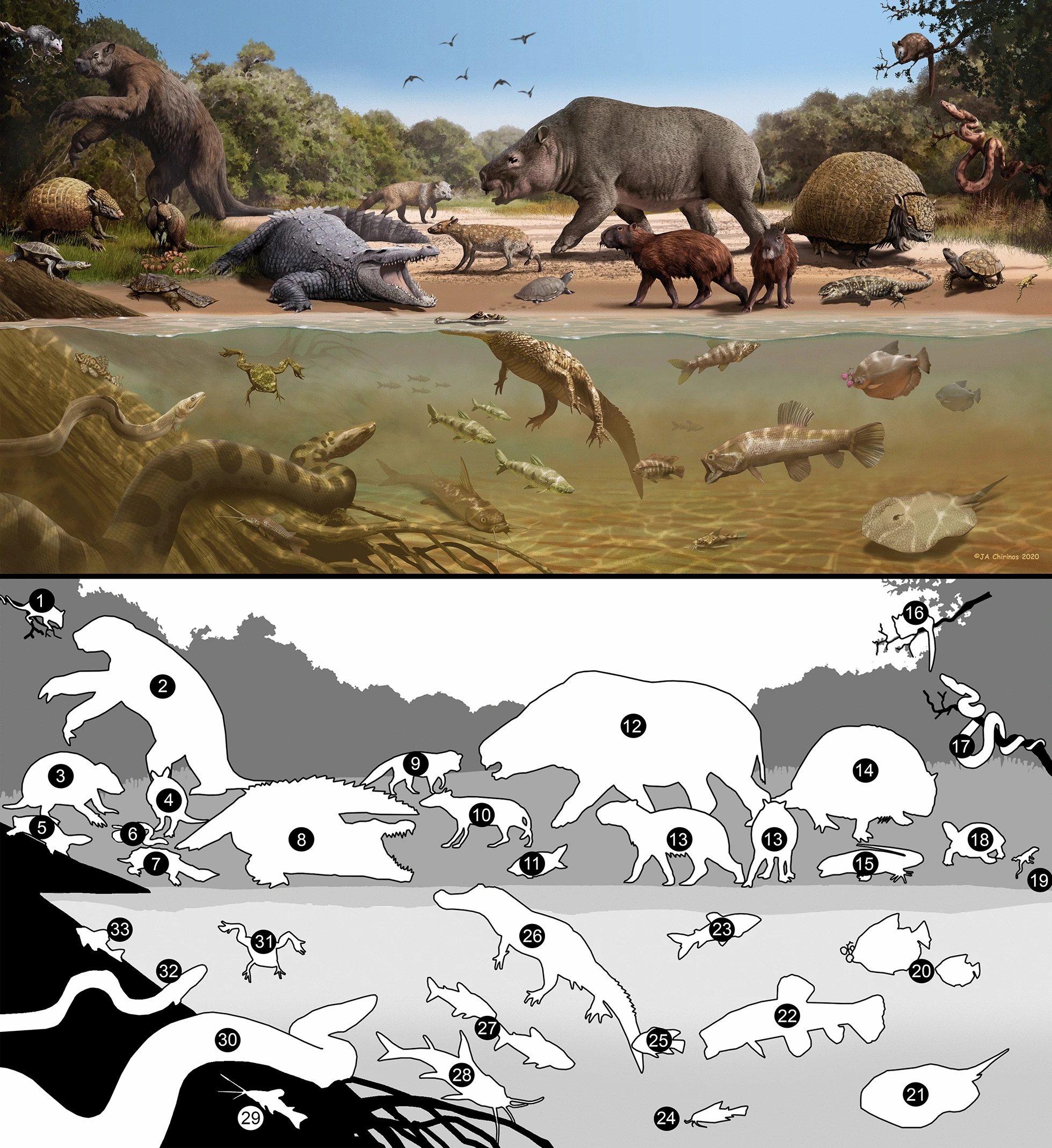
Paleofauna of the San Gregorio Formation, Crocodylus falconensis at (8)

- Crocodylus
  - - - Crocodylus anthropophagus†
      - Crocodylus thorbjarnarsoni†
    - - Crocodylus palaeindicus†
      - Crocodylus Tirari Desert†
  - - Asia+Australia
      - - Crocodylus johnstoni
        - - Crocodylus novaeguineae
          - Crocodylus mindorensis
      - - Crocodylus porosus
        - - Crocodylus siamensis
          - Crocodylus palustris
    - Africa+New World
      - - Crocodylus checchiai†
        - Crocodylus falconensis†
      - - Crocodylus suchus
        - - Crocodylus niloticus
          - New World
            - - Crocodylus moreletii
              - Crocodylus rhombifer
            - - Crocodylus intermedius
              - Crocodylus acutus

== Paleoenvironment ==
C. falconensis was found in the Vergel Member of the San Gregorio Formation, Venezuela, which is known for its rich catfish fauna. The abundance of fossil fish has been interpreted to mean that during the Pliocene, this region was largely covered by floodplains and braided rivers, likely accompanied by some woodland and various other bodies of water such as ponds, swamps, flooded areas and even estuaries as indicated by more salt-tolerant animals. Crocodylus falconensis would have likely inhabited both fresh and brackish water. Other animals found in the region included various notoungulates, xenarthrans like glyptodonts and ground sloths as well as large rodents related to the modern capybara.
