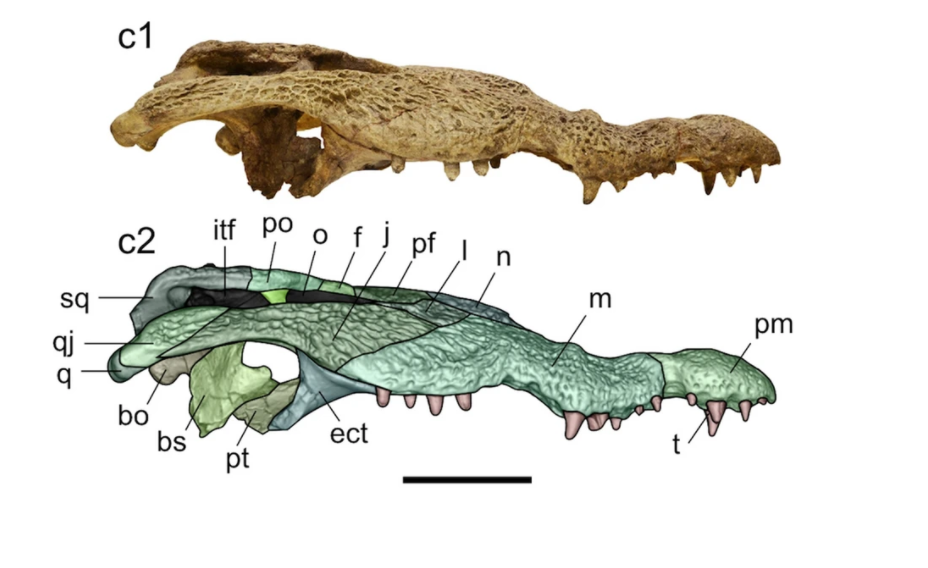
- lateral view of C. checchiai

Scientific classification
- Kingdom: Animalia
- Phylum: Chordata
- Class: Reptilia
- Clade: Archosauria
- Order: Crocodilia
- Superfamily: Crocodyloidea
- Family: Crocodylidae
- Genus: Crocodylus
- Species: †C. checchiai

Binomial name
- †Crocodylus checchiai Maccagno, 1947

= Crocodylus checchiai =

Crocodylus checchiai Temporal range: Late Miocene - Early Pliocene

Extinct species of reptile

Crocodylus checchiai is an extinct species of crocodile from the Miocene to Pliocene of Libya and Kenya. C. checchiai was named in 1947 based on a skull from the Sahabi Formation. Remains from the lower Nawata Formation in the Turkana Basin of Kenya that were first attributed to the Nile crocodile have now been reassigned to C. checchiai, extending its geographic range. The morphology of the species, in particular the pronounced rostral boss, indicates that it may be the connecting link between African and American species of the genus Crocodylus.

== History and naming ==
The remains of C checchiai were originally described by the Italian paleontologist Angiola Maria Maccagno in 1938. The holotype, an adult skull with an associated mandible, was discovered in the Sahabi Formation and later stored in the Istituto di Paleontologia dell’Università di Roma, where it was then thought to be lost. In the years following, four more skulls were excavated in Libya and stored in the Natural History Museum of Tripoli. While photographs of these specimens were published, most of the material was destroyed during WWII with only a single skull surviving, as it was kept in Rome for description at the time. This skull was determined to represent a different variation of C. checchiai by Maccagno, dubbed Crocodylus checchiai var. depressa in 1952. Over 50 years later scientist would eventually discover additional remains from Libya in the form of fragmentary cranial material described in 2008 and in 2012 two skulls from the Tanzanian Nawata Formation would be referred to the taxon by Christopher Brochu and Glen W. Storrs. The two Tanzanian skulls were both previously believed to represent the extant Nile Crocodile. In an attempt to shed light on the position of the species in Crocodylus, which had previously yielded only unclear phylogenetic results, Delfino and colleagues published a detailed redescription of the taxon in 2020. In the process they rediscovering sn813/lj, the skull used by Maccagno to describe Crocodylus checchiai var. depressa.

== Description ==
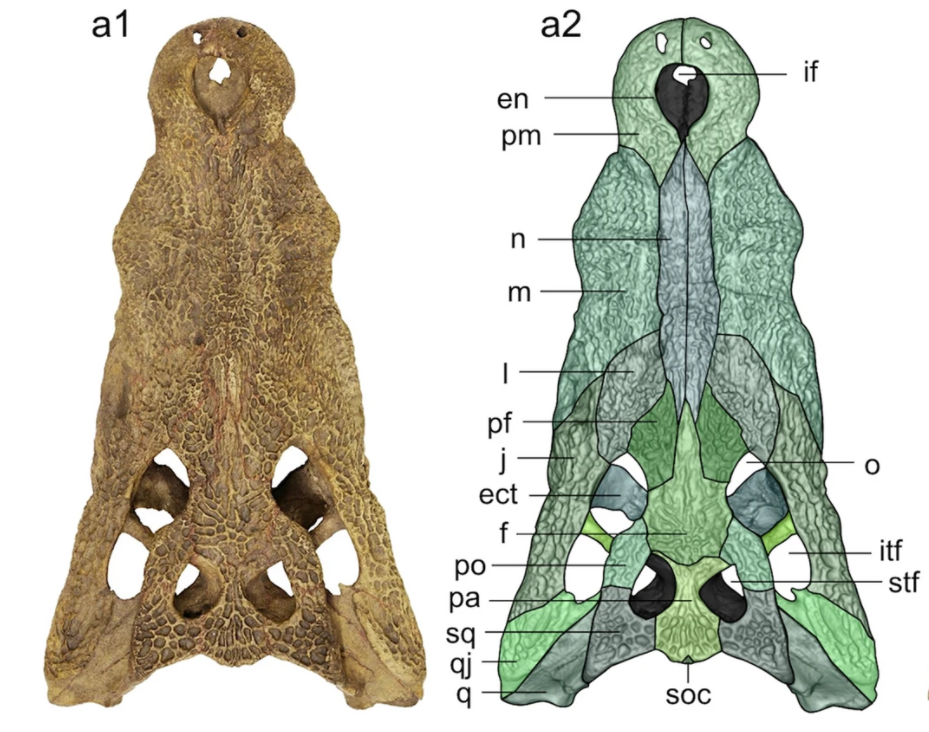
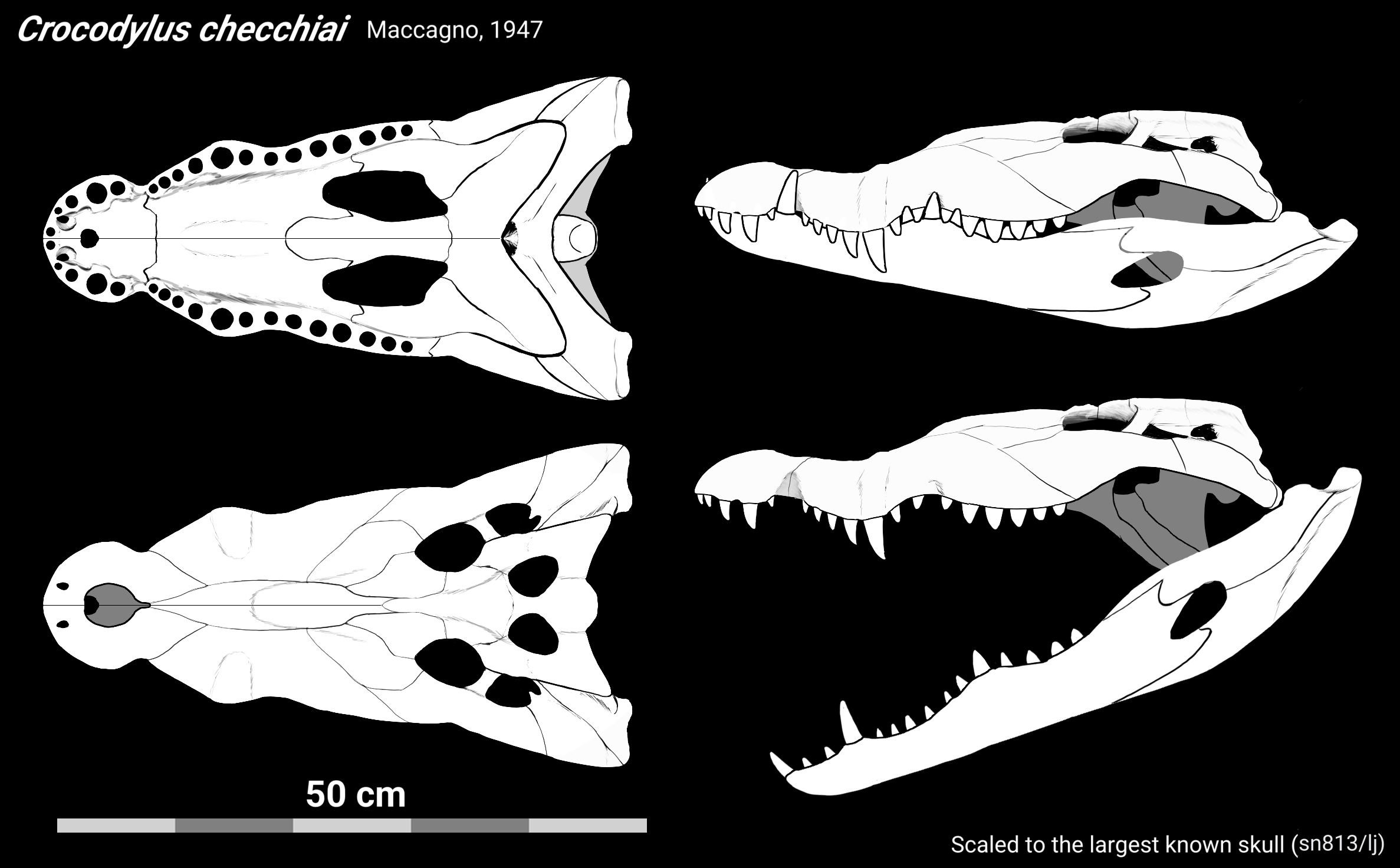
Skull material of Crocodylus checchiai in dorsal view and reconstructed skull from multiple angles.

Specimen sn813/lj represents a mesorostral skull with a length of 47 cm (19 in) from the tip of the snout to the end of the supraoccipital. Most of the skulls surface is heavily ornamented by a dense network of pits and ridges, however despite the very visible ornamentation, most of the finer detail of the skull sutures is obscured by a thin layer of sandy crust. Like other crocodiles, C. checchiai shows a marked constriction behind the external nares where the premaxilla and maxilla connect, making room for an enlarged dentary tooth. The first two dentary teeth are also slightly enlarged, piercing the premaxilla and creating two small holes visible even when viewed from above. The fifth maxillary tooth is likewise enlarged to the point that the maxilla bears a notable convex bump around its root, visible both when viewed from the top and the side. The upper jaw houses a total of eighteen teeth, five in each premaxilla and 13 in each maxilla, arranged in a relatively linear fashion. All teeth of the upper jaw are consistent in shape, with relatively slender shape. In contrast, the teeth show more variation with slender teeth towards the tip of the snout and more stout teeth further back. The lacrimals are larger than the prefrontals and broadly contact the nasal bone without the maxilla inserting itself between the two bones. The external nares are elongated and surrounded mostly by the premaxilla, with a small portion of its posterior edge presumably being composed of the nasal bone (however this area is broken and thus not certain). The orbits are large with a nearly circular ventral margin. The infratemporal fenestrae are smaller, but damaged to breakage towards the back, where the quadratojugal lamina would be. The most notable feature of C. checchiai however is the swollen rostral boss that covers most of the nasals as well as parts of the lacrimals, prefrontals and anterior-most tip of the frontal bone. This type of structure is typical for the Neotropic radiation of Crocodylus, such as the American Crocodile, and unheard of in any other African or Indopacific species of the genus.

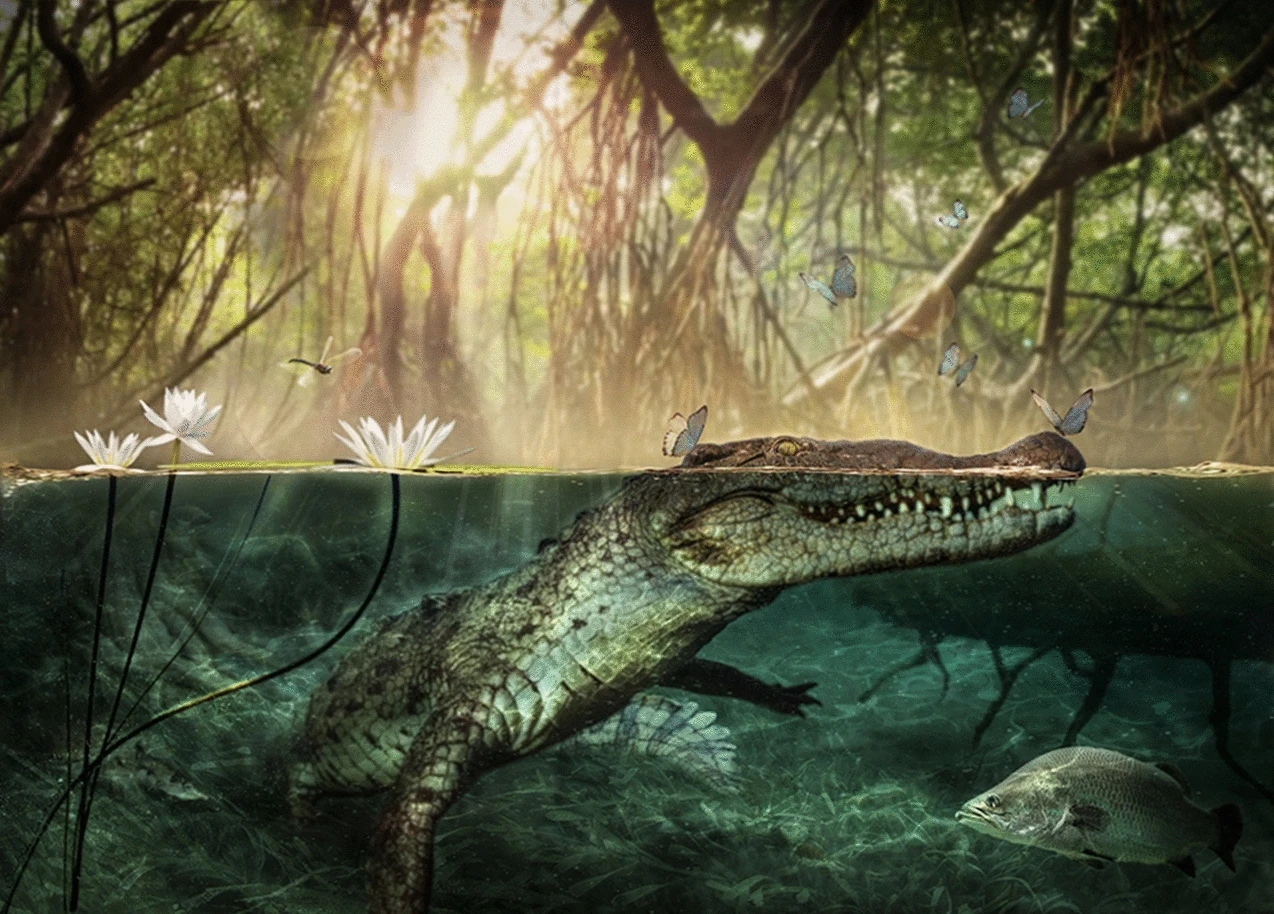
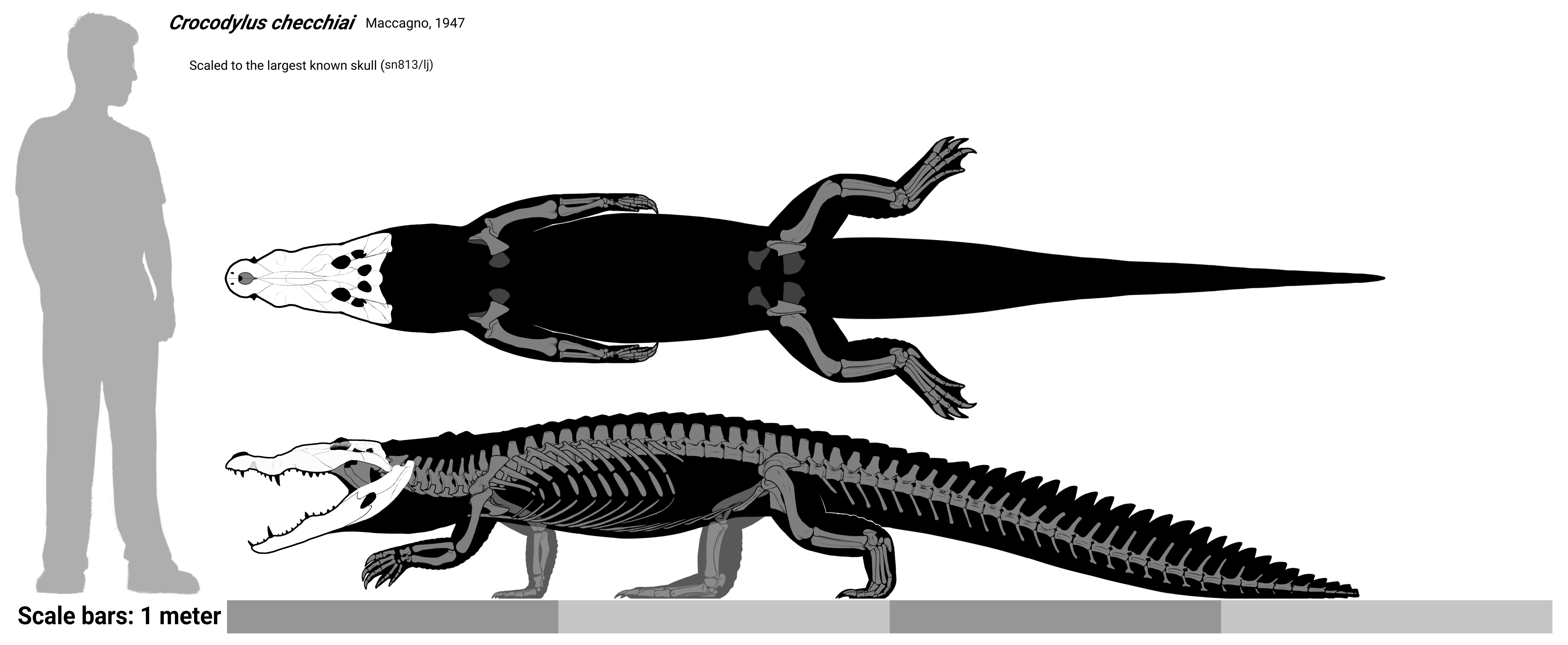
Live reconstruction and size comparison of Crocodylus checchiai.

== Phylogeny and evolution ==
Historically the phylogenetic placement of Crocodylus checchiai has only been poorly explored. Earliest attempts at placing the species within Crocodylus largely ignored the rostral boss in spite of its characteristic nature for neotropic species, with Maccagno initially believing it to be closely related to C. palaeindicus based on characters that are currently thought to be of little to no value. Later research conducted by Tchernov and Leakey instead found ties to the extant Nile Crocodile, with the later even deeming the two species synonymous with one another. The first researcher to recognize ties between C. checchiai and the crocodiles of America was Max K. Hecht, who noted the similar skull structure of C. checchiai specifically in relation to Cuban Crocodiles and Morelet's Crocodile. However, a full phylogenetic analysis was not performed until Brochu & Storrs (2009), who found support for the species inclusion in Crocodylus, but failed to recover its relationship in much more detail due to the formation of a large polytomy. The later analysis conducted by Delfino and colleagues differs from that of Brochu and Storrs in several characters due to the use of the Libyan specimen rather than Tanzanian fossils, which resulted in a better resolved tree finding the taxon to sit at the base of the neotropic clade. This suggests that C. checchiai may be the geographic and phylogenetic link between American Crocodylus species and the ancestral African species. This would shift the dispersal of Crocodylus slightly back in time, but is otherwise consistent with the presumed timeline of the genus' arrival in America (first appearing with Crocodylus falconensis in the Pliocene). C. checchiai may also match the arrival of the genus in Europe, but it's likewise possible that the Italian remains might have come from Asian immigrants.

- - Crocodylus
    - C. palaeindicus†
    - - Indopacific
        - C. palustris
        - - C. siamensis
          - - C. mindorensis
            - - C. porosus
              - - C. johnsoni
                - C. novaeguineae
      - Africa‑New World
        - C. niloticus
        - - Crocodylus checchiai†
          - - C. intermedius
            - - C. falconensis†
              - - C. rhombifer
                - - C. acutus
                  - C. moreletii

A 2018 tip dating study by Lee & Yates simultaneously using morphological, molecular (DNA sequencing), and stratigraphic (fossil age), along with genetic information collected from extinct Voay produced the tree shown below. In it, C. checchiai differs greatly from its previous placement, forming a clade with C. falconensis outside the clade formed by extant Afro-American taxa.

- Crocodylus
  - - - Crocodylus anthropophagus†
      - Crocodylus thorbjarnarsoni†
    - - Crocodylus palaeindicus†
      - Crocodylus Tirari Desert†
  - - Asia+Australia
      - - Crocodylus johnstoni
        - - Crocodylus novaeguineae
          - Crocodylus mindorensis
      - - Crocodylus porosus
        - - Crocodylus siamensis
          - Crocodylus palustris
    - Africa+New World
      - - Crocodylus checchiai†
        - Crocodylus falconensis†
      - - Crocodylus suchus
        - - Crocodylus niloticus
          - New World
            - - Crocodylus moreletii
              - Crocodylus rhombifer
            - - Crocodylus intermedius
              - Crocodylus acutus
