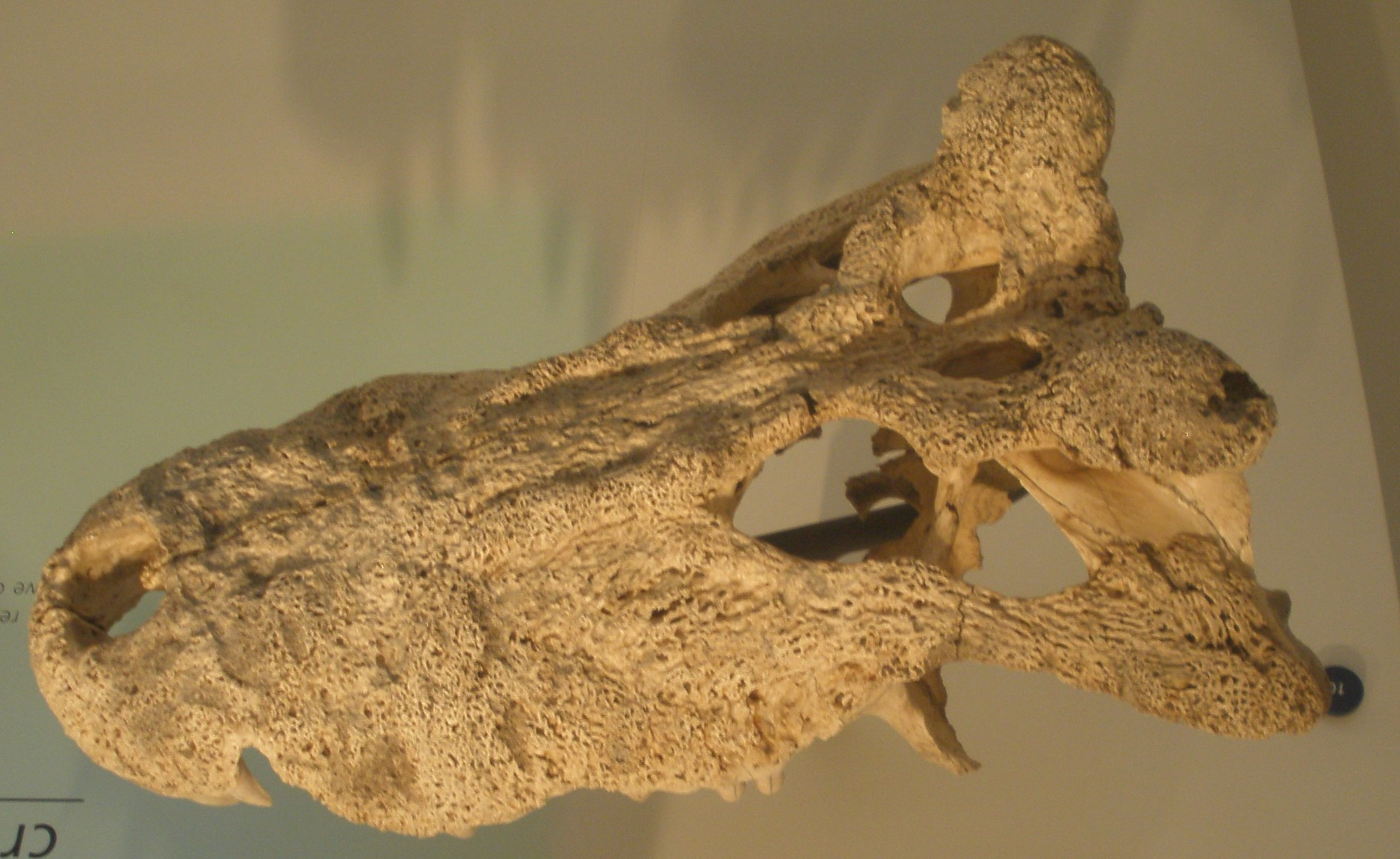
- Skull, American Museum of Natural History

Scientific classification
- Kingdom: Animalia
- Phylum: Chordata
- Class: Reptilia
- Order: Crocodylia
- Family: Crocodylidae
- Subfamily: Crocodylinae
- Genus: †Voay; Brochu, 2007

Type species
- †Voay robustus (Grandidier & Vaillant, 1872)

Synonyms
- Crocodylus robustus Grandidier & Vaillant, 1872

= Voay =

Voay Temporal range: Late Pleistocene to Holocene, 0.1–0.00 Ma Divergence estimates suggest Oligocene origin

Extinct genus of reptiles

Voay is an extinct genus of crocodile from Madagascar that lived during the Late Pleistocene to Holocene, containing only one species, V. robustus. Numerous subfossils have been found, including complete skulls, noted for their distinctive pair of horns on the posterior, as well as vertebrae and osteoderms from such places as Ambolisatra and Antsirabe. The genus is thought to have become extinct relatively recently. It has been suggested to have disappeared in the extinction event that wiped out much of the endemic megafauna on Madagascar, such as the elephant bird and Malagasy hippo, following the arrival of humans to Madagascar around 2000 years ago. Its name comes from the Malagasy word for crocodile.

== Description ==
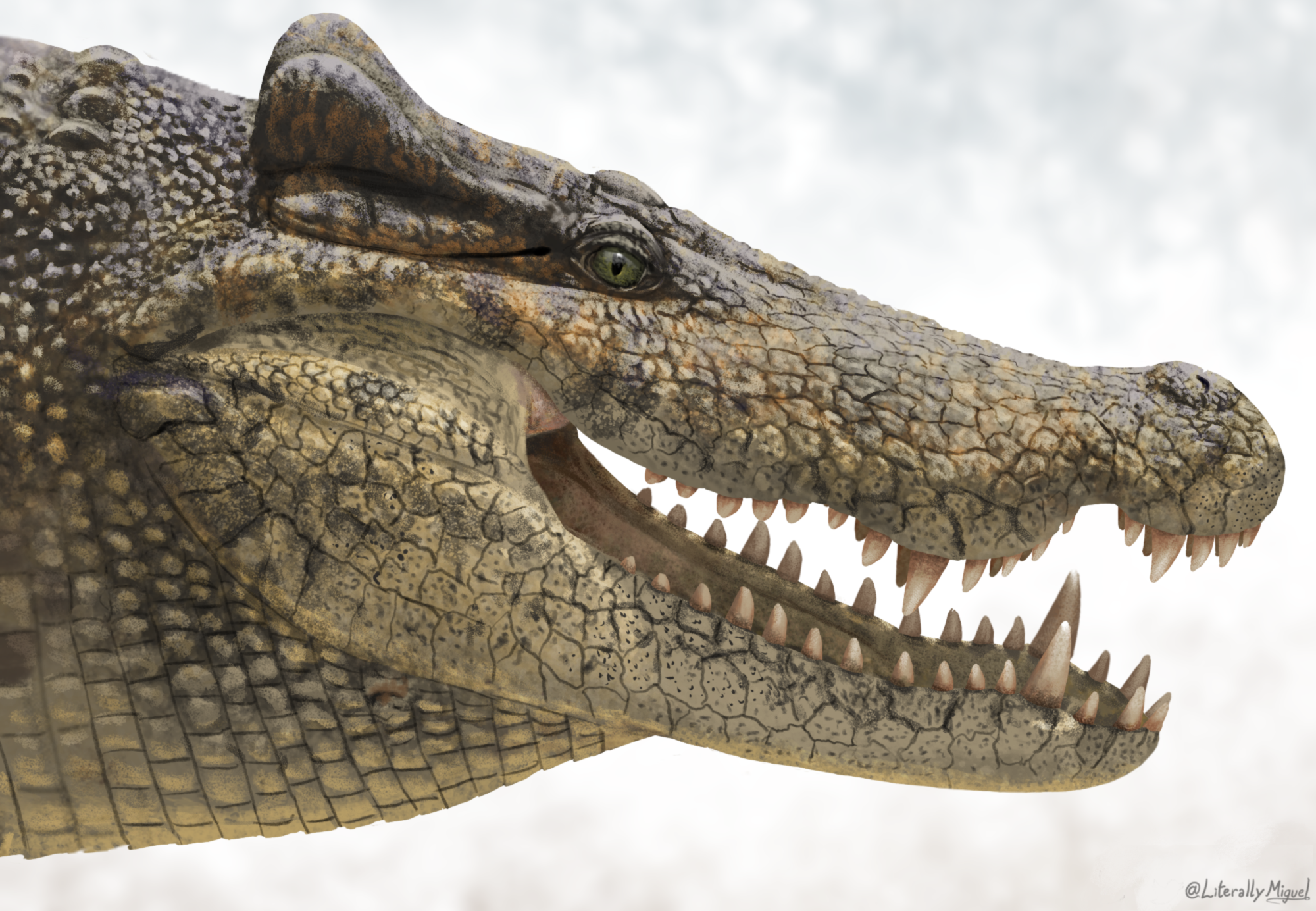
Life reconstruction

One unusual feature of V. robustus that distinguishes it from other crocodilians is the presence of prominent "horns" extending from the posterior portion of the skull. They are actually the posterolaterally extended corners of the squamosal bone. Other related crocodilians such as Aldabrachampsus also had similar bony projections, although in Aldabrachampsus these projections were more like crests than horns. Another diagnostic characteristic is the near-exclusion of the nasals from the external naris. It had a shorter and deeper snout than the extant Crocodylus niloticus, as well as relatively robust limbs. The osteoderms had tall keels and were dorsally symmetrical with curved lateral margins, running the entire length of the postcranial body.

V. robustus would have measured around 3.5–4 m (11–13 ft) long and weighed about 170 kg (370 lb). These estimates suggest that V. robustus was the largest predator to have existed in Madagascar in recent times. Its size, stature, and presumed behavior is similar to the modern Nile crocodile (Crocodylus niloticus). Because V. robustus shared so many similarities with the Nile crocodile there must have been a great deal of interspecies competition for resources between the two crocodile genera if they were to have coexisted with one another. It has recently been proposed that the Nile crocodile only migrated to the island from mainland Africa after V. robustus had become extinct in Madagascar. However, this was subsequently disproved after some Crocodylus specimens from Madagascar were found to be at least 7,500 years old and contemporaneous with Voay.

== Phylogenetics ==
When V. robustus was first described in 1872, it was originally assigned to the genus Crocodylus. It was later found to morphologically have had more in common with the extant Osteolaemus, or dwarf crocodile, than Crocodylus. Some features it shared with Osteolaemus include a depressed pterygoid surface that forms a choanal "neck" on the palate. Because it was not close enough to be placed in the same genus as the dwarf crocodile, it was assigned to the new genus in 2007. Before this reassignment, the species was considered by some to be synonymous with Crocodylus niloticus. However, this was most likely due to a misinterpretation of remains from the living C. niloticus with V. robustus and the poor description of the original material from which the species was described. In contrast to the morphological similarities with Osteolaemus, a 2021 study using paleogenomics found Voay to be a sister group to Crocodylus, with both genera diverging in the mid-late Oligocene; this indicates that the apparent similarities with Osteolaemus are likely due to convergent evolution.

The below cladogram shows the results of the 2021 study, with supplementary data from the 2023 study by Sales-Oliveira et al.:

- Crocodylidae (crown group)
  - Osteolaeminae
    - - - Mecistops cataphractus West African slender-snouted crocodile
        - Mecistops leptorhynchus Central African slender-snouted crocodile
      - Euthecodon †
    - - Brochuchus †
      - - Rimasuchus †
        - - - Osteolaemus osborni Osborn's dwarf crocodile
          - - Osteolaemus tetraspis Dwarf crocodile
            - Osteolaemus sp. West
  - Crocodylinae
    - Voay
      Voay robustus †
    - Crocodylus
      - - - Crocodylus anthropophagus †
          - Crocodylus thorbjarnarsoni †
        - - Crocodylus palaeindicus †
          - Crocodylus Tirari Desert †
      - - - - - - Crocodylus johnstoni Freshwater crocodile
            - - - Crocodylus novaeguineae New Guinea crocodile
                - Crocodylus halli Hall's New Guinea crocodile
              - - Crocodylus mindorensis Philippine crocodile
          - - - - Crocodylus porosus Saltwater crocodile
            - - - Crocodylus siamensis Siamese crocodile
              - - Crocodylus palustris Mugger crocodile
        - - - Crocodylus checchiai †
            - Crocodylus falconensis †
          - - - - - - Crocodylus suchus West African crocodile
            - - - - - Crocodylus niloticus Nile crocodile
              - - - - Crocodylus rhombifer Cuban crocodile
                - - - Crocodylus intermedius Orinoco crocodile
                    - Crocodylus acutus American crocodile
                  - - Crocodylus moreletii Morelet's crocodile
