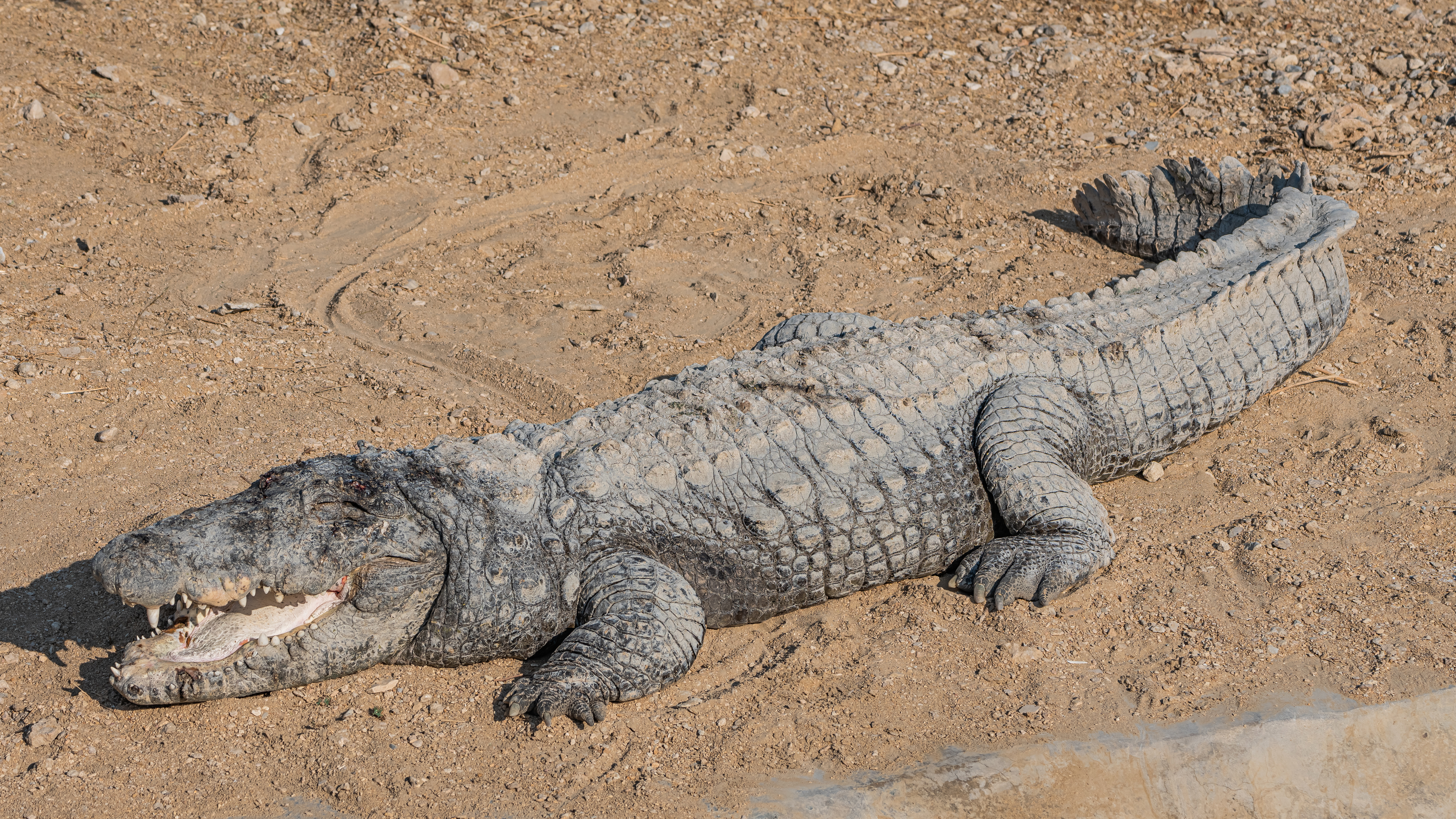
- Mugger crocodile (C. palustris)

Scientific classification
- Kingdom: Animalia
- Phylum: Chordata
- Class: Reptilia
- Order: Crocodylia
- Family: Crocodylidae
- Subfamily: Crocodylinae
- Genus: Crocodylus; Laurenti, 1768

Type species
- Crocodylus niloticus Laurenti, 1768

Species
- See text
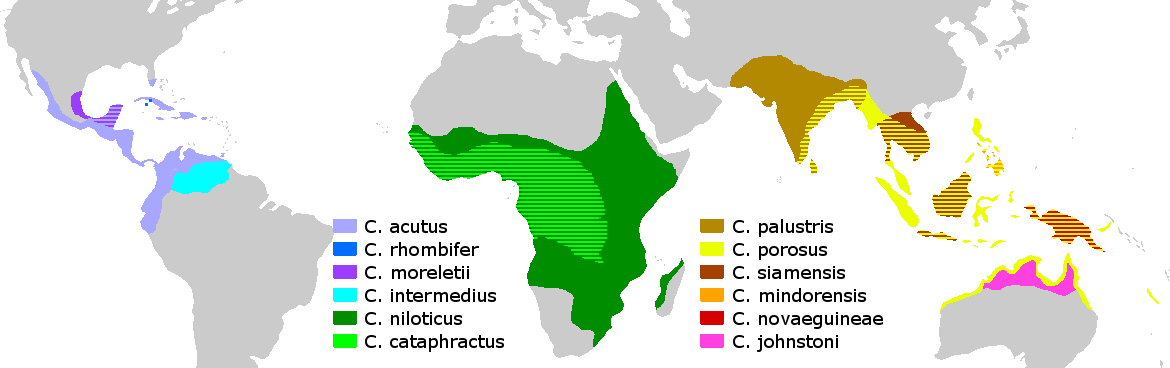
- Worldwide distribution of Crocodylus

Synonyms
- Bombifrons Gray, 1862; Crocodillus Scopoli, 1777; Crocodilus Gmelin, 1789; Crocodilus Laurenti, 1768; Crocodylus Gronovius, 1763; Mecistops Gray, 1844; Molina Romer, 1956; Molinia Gray, 1862; Motinia Gray, 1844; Oopholis Gray, 1844; Oxycrocodylus Hoser, 2012; Palinia Gray, 1844; Philas Gray, 1874; Temsacus Gray, 1862

= Crocodylus =

Crocodylus Temporal range: Late Oligocene - recent, 25–0 Ma

Genus of reptiles

Crocodylus is a genus of true crocodiles in the family Crocodylidae.

== Taxonomy ==
The generic name, Crocodylus, was proposed by Josephus Nicolaus Laurenti in 1768. Crocodylus contains 13–14 extant (living) species and 5 extinct species. There are additional extinct species attributed to the genus Crocodylus that studies have shown no longer belong, although they have not yet been reassigned to new genera.

=== Extant species ===
The 13–14 living species are:

Image	Scientific name	Common name	Distribution
	Crocodylus acutus (Cuvier, 1807)	American crocodile	Southern Florida and the Atlantic and Pacific coasts of north Mexico to North America as far south as Peru and Venezuela, Cuba, Jamaica, Hispaniola and Grand Cayman.
	Crocodylus halli Murray, Russo, Zorrilla & McMahan, 2019	Hall's crocodile	southern New Guinea
	Crocodylus intermedius (Graves, 1819)	Orinoco crocodile	Colombia and Venezuela
	Crocodylus johnstoni Krefft, 1873	Freshwater crocodile	Northern regions of Australia
	Crocodylus mindorensis Schmidt, 1935	Philippine crocodile	Northern Sierra Madre Natural Park within the Luzon rainforest, San Mariano, Isabela, Dalupiri island in the Babuyan Islands, Abra (province) in Luzon and the Ligawasan Marsh, Lake Sebu in South Cotabato, Pulangi River in Bukidnon, and possibly in the Agusan Marsh Wildlife Sanctuary in Mindanao
	Crocodylus moreletii (A. H. A. Duméril & Bibron, 1851)	Morelet's crocodile or Mexican crocodile	Mexico, Belize and Guatemala
	Crocodylus niloticus Laurenti, 1768	Nile crocodile or African crocodile, (the subspecies found in Madagascar, C. n. madagascariensis, is sometimes called the black crocodile)	Israel and Syria (historically), Somalia, Ethiopia, Uganda, Kenya, Egypt, the Central African Republic, the Democratic Republic of the Congo, Equatorial Guinea, Tanzania, Rwanda, Burundi, Zambia, Zimbabwe, Gabon, Angola, South Africa, Malawi, Mozambique, Sudan, South Sudan, Botswana, and Cameroon
	Crocodylus novaeguineae Schmidt, 1928	New Guinea crocodile	northern New Guinea
	Crocodylus palustris (Lesson, 1831)	Mugger crocodile, marsh crocodile, or Indian crocodile	southern Iran, southern Pakistan, southern Nepal, India, Sri Lanka
	Crocodylus porosus Schneider, 1801	Saltwater crocodile or estuarine crocodile	Eastern India, Sri Lanka, Southeast Asia and Northern Australia
	Crocodylus rhombifer (Cuvier, 1807)	Cuban crocodile	Cuba
	Crocodylus siamensis Schneider, 1801	Siamese crocodile	Indonesia (Borneo and possibly Java), Brunei, East Malaysia, Laos, Cambodia, Myanmar, Thailand and Vietnam.
	Crocodylus suchus Geoffroy, 1807	West African crocodile or desert crocodile	Mauritania, Benin, Liberia, Nigeria, Niger, Cameroon, Chad, Central African Republic, Equatorial Guinea, Senegal, Mali, Guinea, Gambia, Burkina Faso, Ghana, Gabon, Togo, Ivory Coast and Republic of Congo
	Crocodylus raninus S. Müller & Schlegel, 1844 (Considered to be a synonym of Crocodylus porosus; its status remains unclear).	Borneo crocodile	Borneo

=== Fossils ===
Crocodylus also includes seven extinct species:

- † Crocodylus anthropophagus is an extinct crocodile from Plio-Pleistocene of Tanzania.
- † Crocodylus checchiai is an extinct crocodile from Late Miocene of Kenya.
- † Crocodylus falconensis is an extinct crocodile from Early Pliocene of Venezuela.
- † Crocodylus palaeindicus is an extinct crocodile from Miocene to the Pleistocene of India and possibly Myanmar & Pakistan.
- † Crocodylus thorbjarnarsoni is an extinct crocodile from Plio-Pleistocene of Kenya.
- † Crocodylus sudani is an extinct crocodile from the Late Pleistocene of Sudan.
- † Crocodylus lucivenator is an extinct crocodile from the Late Pliocene of Ethiopia.

== Evolution ==
While taxonomists generally agree that the crown group of Crocodylus appeared ~16 - 14 million years ago, there is an ongoing debate discussing whether the genus has an African or Indo-Pacific origin. Proponents of the African origin point towards phylogenetic evidence suggesting that the most recent common ancestor of Crocodylus and its sister genus, Voay, diverged around 25 million years ago near the Oligocene/Miocene boundary. This theory is supported by the existence of closely related African genera Osteolaemus and Mecistops.

Proponents of the Indo-Pacific origin claim that the origin of the genus closely coincides with the appearance of the oldest known species, Crocodylus palaeindicus, in South Asia. Additionally, mitochondrial analysis consistently places Indo-Pacific species Crocodylus mindorensis, Crocodylus novaeguineae, and Crocodylus johnstoni in the basal-most clade of the genus. All known New World and African crocodylus species have a much more recent evolutionary origin. While the exact origins of the genus remain uncertain, the most recent common ancestor of the species likely utilized osmoregulatory adaptations, including lingual salt glands, to radiate across the tropics.

=== Phylogeny ===
A 2018 tip dating study by Lee & Yates simultaneously using morphological, molecular (DNA sequencing), and stratigraphic (fossil age) data established the inter-relationships within Crocodylidae. In 2021, Hekkala et al. were able to use paleogenomics, extracting DNA from the extinct Voay, to better establish the relationships within Crocodylidae, including the subfamilies Crocodylinae and Osteolaeminae. In 2023, Sales-Oliveira et al. suggested the relationships of recently recognised species (M. leptorhynchus, C. halli and the third Osteolaemus species).

The below cladogram shows the results of the 2021 study, with supplementary data from the 2023 study:

- Crocodylidae (crown group)
  - Osteolaeminae
    - - - Mecistops cataphractus West African slender-snouted crocodile
        - Mecistops leptorhynchus Central African slender-snouted crocodile
      - Euthecodon †
    - - Brochuchus †
      - - Rimasuchus †
        - - - Osteolaemus osborni Osborn's dwarf crocodile
          - - Osteolaemus tetraspis Dwarf crocodile
            - Osteolaemus sp. West
  - Crocodylinae
    - Voay
      Voay robustus †
    - Crocodylus
      - - - Crocodylus anthropophagus †
          - Crocodylus thorbjarnarsoni †
        - - Crocodylus palaeindicus †
          - Crocodylus Tirari Desert †
      - - - - - - Crocodylus johnstoni Freshwater crocodile
            - - - Crocodylus novaeguineae New Guinea crocodile
                - Crocodylus halli Hall's New Guinea crocodile
              - - Crocodylus mindorensis Philippine crocodile
          - - - - Crocodylus porosus Saltwater crocodile
            - - - Crocodylus siamensis Siamese crocodile
              - - Crocodylus palustris Mugger crocodile
        - - - Crocodylus checchiai †
            - Crocodylus falconensis †
          - - - - - - Crocodylus suchus West African crocodile
            - - - - - Crocodylus niloticus Nile crocodile
              - - - - Crocodylus rhombifer Cuban crocodile
                - - - Crocodylus intermedius Orinoco crocodile
                    - Crocodylus acutus American crocodile
                  - - Crocodylus moreletii Morelet's crocodile
