= Aldabrachampsus =

Aldabrachampsus Temporal range: Late Pleistocene 0.118 Ma

Scientific classification
- Kingdom: Animalia
- Phylum: Chordata
- Class: Reptilia
- Order: Crocodylia
- Family: Crocodylidae
- Genus: †Aldabrachampsus; Brochu, 2006

Type species
- †Aldabrachampsus dilophus Brochu, 2006

Extinct genus of reptiles

Aldabrachampsus is an extinct genus of small horned crocodile known from fragmentary remains. It lived during the Pleistocene on Aldabra Atoll, Seychelles in the western Indian Ocean. The name Aldabrachampsus dilophus means "Two-crested crocodile from Aldabra". It was a small animal, reaching a length of 2–2.5 m (6 ft 7 in – 8 ft 2 in), comparable in size to the smallest extant crocodilians.

== Description ==
Aldabrachampsus is only known from fragmentary cranial and mandibular remains including the premaxilla, frontal bone, parietal, dentaries and squamosals among others. Some postcranial bones are also known including several vertebrae and a femur. Like most other crocodilians Aldabrachampsus possessed five teeth situated in the premaxilla, however the second to fifth are all aligned in a straight line rather than following a convex path. Following the premaxillary teeth the rostrum of the crocodile constricted, creating a notch for one of the dentary teeth. There is a toothless region (diastema) present between the second and third alveoli of the dentary. The orbital margins of both the frontal and prefrontal bone are raised. The main body of the frontal is shaped like a pentagon with a distinctly V-shaped suture with the parietals, excluding the frontal from contributing to the supratemporal fenestrae. The anterior process of the frontal bone is slender and notably protrudes from the body following a sudden sharp constriction. Of the parietal only the posterior section is known, which shows a flat surface and a deep notch in its rear margin exposing the occipital region. The squamosal bone widens towards its suture with the postorbital and the bone bears a horn-like projection that faces outwards. Similar structures are known in the Madagascar crocodile Voay, Crocodylus anthropophagus from Tanzania and even alligatoroids like Acresuchus and Ceratosuchus. In modern species both Siamese crocodiles and Cuban crocodiles share similar squamosal horns. However Aldabrachampsus differs from these taxa in two ways. The horns are notably less pointed, showing a more rounded morphology, and their apex is located towards the halfway point of the bone, rather than the squamosal horns of other crocodilians which reach their apex towards the posterior.

The vertebrae show that the neural centra and neural arches were at least partly fused with the sutures beginning to close. This indicates that the animals these bones belonged to had almost reached their adult size. With a length of 2.5–3 cm (0.98–1.18 in) the vertebrae suggest that the animal, assuming similar proportions to modern crocodiles, was relatively small in size, approximately 2–2.5 m (6 ft 7 in – 8 ft 2 in) long. Extrapolating the size based on the skull remains gives similar results ranging from 1–2 m (3 ft 3 in – 6 ft 7 in). This size would be similar to the smallest extant crocodilians, the South American dwarf caimans and African dwarf crocodiles, alongside extinct dwarf mekosuchines like Volia and Mekosuchus. Some crocodilian remains found later might indicate the presence of a larger bodied and more robust animal on the island, it is however not clear if these fossils belong to a large specimen or species of Aldabrachampsus or a taxon previously not known from the island like the Nile crocodile or an osteolaemine related to Voay. These remains indicate a crocodile with a body length of 2.9–3.7 m (9 ft 6 in – 12 ft 2 in).

== Classification ==
The fragmentary nature of Aldabrachampsus has left its exact placement within Crocodilia somewhat ambiguous. Phylogenetic analysis suggests it is part of the family Crocodylidae, composed of the subfamilies Crocodylinae and Osteolaeminae. Although this relationship is recovered by the strict consensus tree, which results in a large polytomy rendering Aldabrachampsus's exact position unknown, other trees suggest potentially different relationships. In some trees, Aldabrachampsus is recovered as a sister taxon to Voay, while others find it to be a sister to Crocodylus palaeindicus. However, both these positions are weakly supported, based on a single morphological character (the exposed supraoccipital), which is expressed differently between the different crocodiles in question. Brochu, however, argues that despite being based on the same character, a relationship to Voay (then Crocodylus robustus) within Osteolaeminae was more likely due to the anatomy of the nares, palate and the squamosal horns, although they differ in shape.

== Evolution ==
The first remains of Aldabrachampsus were found in Quaternary deposits of Point Hodoul at the eastern end of the Aldabra Atoll. The limestone cavities that yielded these remains also preserved the fossils of lizards, tortoises, birds and land snails and date to approximately 118,000 years ago. Just before the appearance of Aldabrachampsus the atoll was entirely submerged by water, which suggests that rather than being an endemic species affected by island dwarfism, this crocodile was already of small stature by the time it arrived on the island. The fragmentary nature and poorly resolved phylogenetic relationships however make it difficult to determine where Aldabrachampsus originated. It is possible that the genus arrived in the Aldabra Atoll from the east, assuming close relationship with Crocodylus palaeindicus, however Brochu again suggests that a relationship to Voay and thus an African or Malagasy origin is more likely. A Malagasy origin would be consistent with the proximity between the atoll and Madagascar, which has led to faunal exchanges between the islands, especially prominent in regards to tortoises. Given the small stature of Osteolaemus, it is possible that minute bodysize is ancestral to this grouping and was simply reversed by Voay on Madagascar. Another hypothesis meanwhile suggests that smaller bodysize is a trait evolved by Osteolaemus and Aldabrachampsus independently of one another.

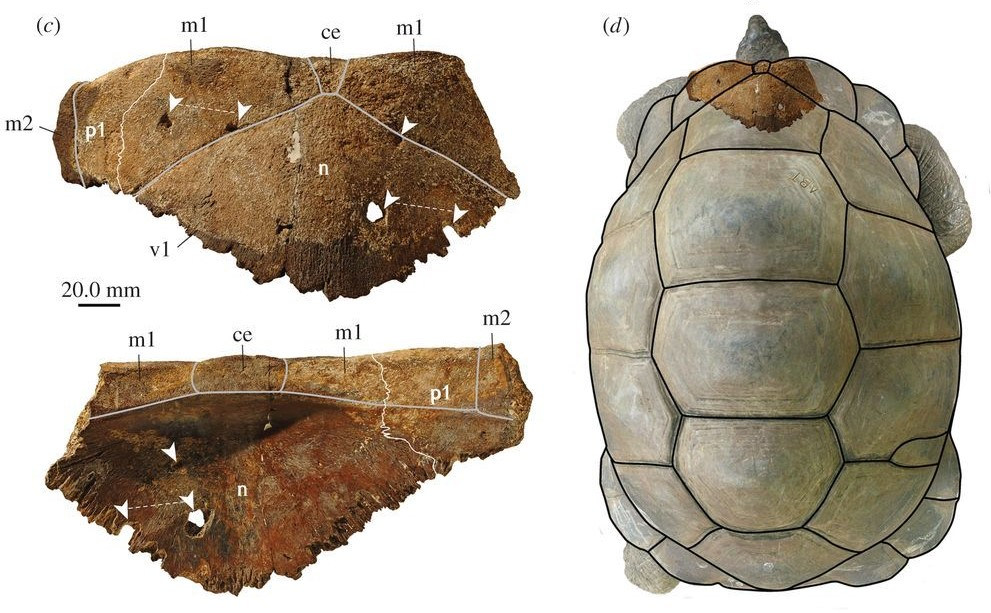
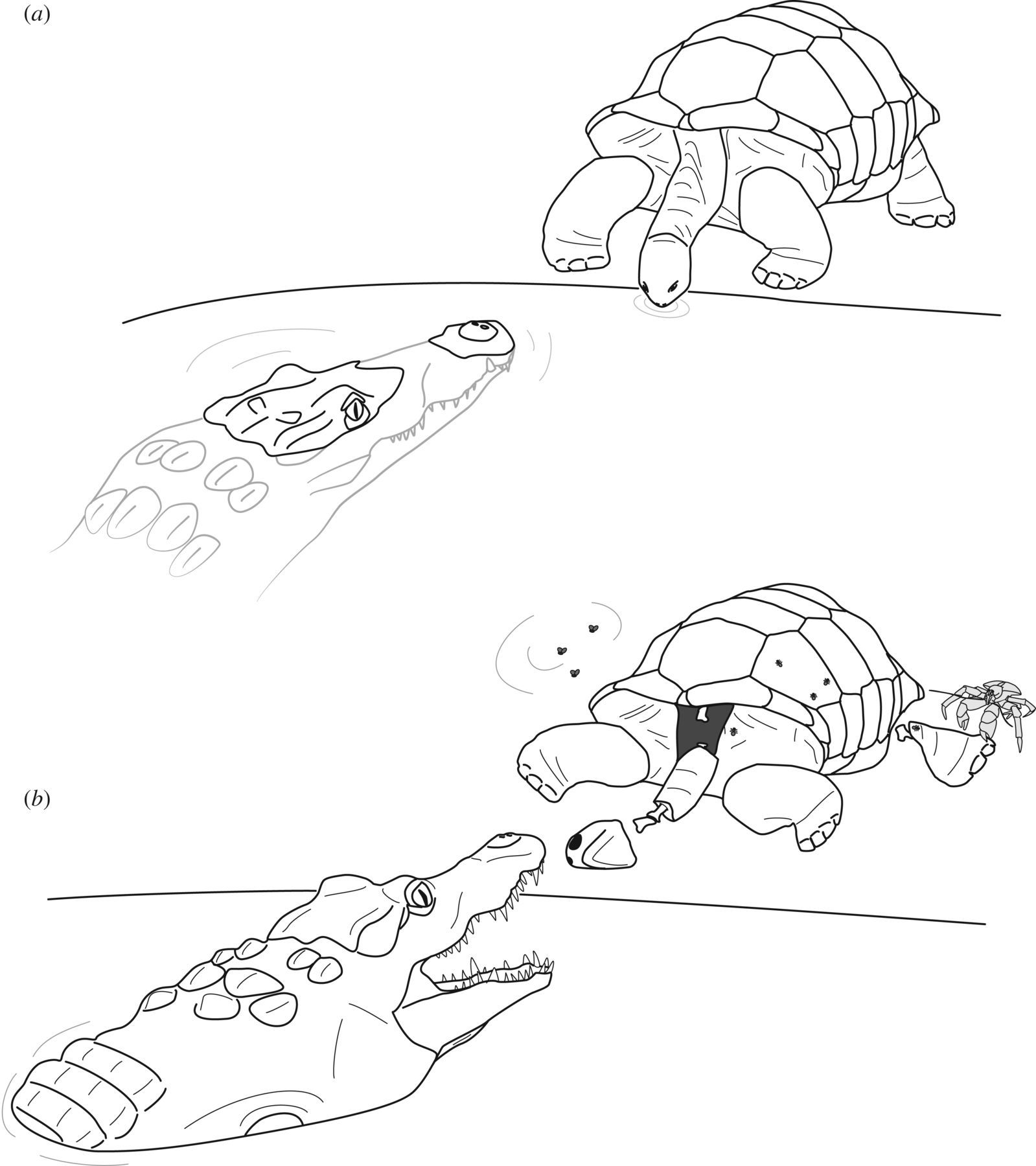
Fossil evidence shows that crocodilians fed on the Aldabra giant tortoise

== Paleoecology ==
Fossil discoveries made at a dried up pond on Grande Terre Island corresponding to the Late Pleistocene Aldabra Limestone show evidence of a predator-prey relationship between crocodilians and the native giant tortoise Aldabrachelys gigantea. Several tortoise shell fragments from the site are known to bear distinct feeding marks in the form of unhealed puncture wounds inflicted to the nuchal armor, plastron and the pubis of the tortoise. It is possible that a crocodile attacked and killed a tortoise head on as it was drinking at a watering hole, puncturing the nuchal plate at the front of the shell rather than attacking the high, better defended sides of the turtle. Another possibility is that the tortoise was not killed by crocodiles and instead only scavenged on. Again the punctures on the nuchal shield are caused by the fact that this particular area allows for better access at the meat beneath the shell. However, as the crocodile remains found alongside the turtle bones are notably larger than any previously recorded Aldabrachampsus specimens and very fragmentary, it is not certain if they belong to the same genus or instead represent a second species of crocodile native to the island.
