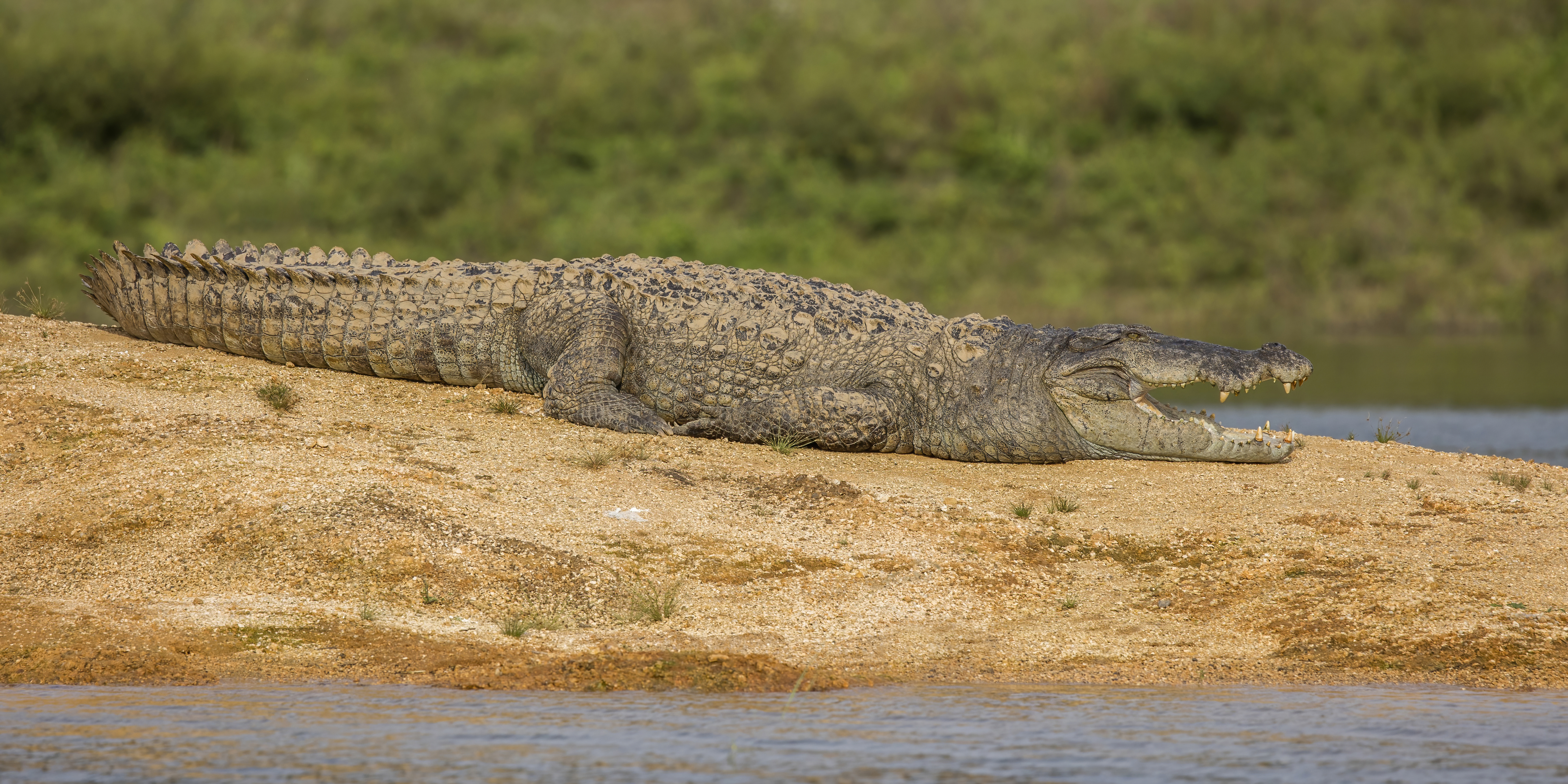

Conservation status
- Vulnerable (IUCN 3.1)
- CITES Appendix I

Scientific classification
- Kingdom: Animalia
- Phylum: Chordata
- Class: Reptilia
- Order: Crocodylia
- Family: Crocodylidae
- Genus: Crocodylus
- Species: C. palustris

Binomial name
- Crocodylus palustris (Lesson, 1831)
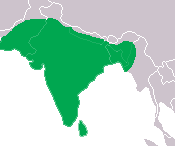
- Distribution of mugger crocodile

Synonyms
- Crocodilus palustris Lesson, 1831; Crocodilus vulgarts var. indicus Gray, 1831; Crocodilus bombifrons Gray, 1844; Crocodilus trigonops Gray, 1844; Crocodylus palustris subsp. kimbula Deraniyagala, 1936

= Mugger crocodile =

Mugger crocodile Temporal range: Late Pleistocene–Present, 0.1–0 Ma

Species of crocodile from Asia

The mugger crocodile (Crocodylus palustris) is a medium-sized broad-snouted crocodile, also known as mugger and marsh crocodile. It is native to freshwater habitats from south-eastern Iran to the Indian subcontinent, where it inhabits marshes, lakes, rivers and artificial ponds. It rarely reaches a body length of 5 m (16 ft 5 in) and is a powerful swimmer, but also walks on land in search of suitable waterbodies during the hot season. Both young and adult mugger crocodiles dig burrows to which they retreat when the ambient temperature drops below 5 °C (41 °F) or exceeds 38 °C (100 °F). Females dig holes in the sand as nesting sites and lay up to 46 eggs during the dry season. The sex of hatchlings depends on temperature during incubation. Both parents protect the young for up to one year. They feed on insects, and adults prey on fish, reptiles, birds and mammals.

The mugger crocodile evolved at least 4.19 million years ago and has been a symbol for the fructifying and destructive powers of the rivers since the Vedic period. It was first scientifically described in 1831 and is protected by law in Iran, India and Sri Lanka. Since 1982, it has been listed as Vulnerable on the IUCN Red List. Outside protected areas, it is threatened by conversion of natural habitats, gets entangled in fishing nets and is killed in human–wildlife conflict situations and in traffic accidents.

== Taxonomy ==
Crocodilus palustris was the scientific name proposed by René Lesson in 1831 who scientifically described the type specimen from the Gangetic plains. In subsequent years, several naturalists and curators of natural history museums described zoological specimens and proposed different names, including:

- C. bombifrons by John Edward Gray in 1844 for a specimen sent by the Museum of the Royal Asiatic Society of Bengal to the British Museum of Natural History.
- C. trigonops also by Gray in 1844 for a young mugger specimen from India.

== Evolution ==
Phylogenetic analysis of 23 crocodilian species indicated that the genus Crocodylus most likely originated in Australasia about 13.72 to 8.28 million years ago. The freshwater crocodile (C. johnstoni) is thought to have been the first species that genetically diverged from the common ancestor of the genus about 12.45 to 7.17 million years ago. The sister group comprising saltwater crocodile (C. porosus), Siamese crocodile (C. siamensis) and mugger crocodile diverged about 11.65 to 6.52 million years ago. The latter diverged from this group about 8.91 to 4.19 million years ago. A paleogenomics analysis indicated that Crocodylus likely originated in Africa and radiated towards Southeast Asia and the Americas, diverging from its closest recent relative, the extinct Voay of Madagascar, around 25 million years ago near the Oligocene/Miocene boundary. Within Crocodylus, the mugger crocodile's closest living relatives are the Siamese crocodile and the saltwater crocodile.

Fossil crocodile specimens excavated in the Sivalik Hills closely resemble the mugger crocodile in the shortness of the premaxillae and in the form of the nasal openings. In Andhra Pradesh's Prakasam district, a 30.6 cm (12.0 in) long fossilized skull of a mugger crocodile was found in a volcanic ash bed that probably dates to the late Pleistocene. Crocodylus palaeindicus from late Pliocene sediments in the Sivalik Hills is thought to be an ancestor of the mugger crocodile. Fossil remains of C. palaeindicus were also excavated in the vicinity of Bagan in central Myanmar.

Phylogenetic relationships of the mugger crocodile based on

analysis of 12 concatenated mitochondrial DNA sequences

- Crocodylus
  - - - - American crocodile (C. acutus)
        - Orinoco crocodile (C. intermedius)
      - - Cuban crocodile (C. rhombifer)
        - Morelet's crocodile (C. moreletii)
    - Nile crocodile (C. niloticus)
  - - - Saltwater crocodile (C. porosus)
      - - Mugger crocodile
        - Siamese crocodile (C. siamensis)
    - - New Guinea crocodile (C. novaeguineae)
      - Philippine crocodile (C. mindorensis)
  - Freshwater crocodile (C. johnstoni)

based on Illumina sequencing of mitogenomes

- Crocodylus
  - - - - - Orinoco crocodile
          - American crocodile
        - Cuban crocodile
      - Morelet's crocodile
    - Nile crocodile
  - - - - - Mugger crocodile
          - Siamese crocodile
        - Saltwater crocodile
    - - - New Guinea crocodile
        - Philippine crocodile
      - Freshwater crocodile

Below cladogram is from a tip dating study, for which morphological, molecular DNA sequencing and stratigraphic fossil age data were simultaneously used to establish the inter-relationships within Crocodylidae. This cladogram was revised in a paleogenomics study.

- Crocodylidae (crown group)
  - Osteolaeminae
    - - West African slender-snouted crocodile Mecistops cataphractus
      - Euthecodon†
    - - Brochuchus†
      - - Rimasuchus†
        - - Osborn's dwarf crocodile Osteolaemus osborni
          - Dwarf crocodile Osteolaemus tetraspis
  - Crocodylinae
    - Voay†
    - Crocodylus
      - - - Crocodylus anthropophagus†
          - Crocodylus thorbjarnarsoni†
        - - Crocodylus palaeindicus†
          - Crocodylus Tirari Desert†
      - - Asia+Australia
          - - Freshwater crocodile
            - - New Guinea crocodile
              - Philippine crocodile
          - - Saltwater crocodile
            - - Siamese crocodile
              - Mugger crocodile
        - Africa+New World
          - - Crocodylus checchiai†
            - Crocodylus falconensis†
          - - West African crocodile C. suchus
            - - Nile crocodile
              - New World
                - - Morelet's crocodile
                  - Cuban crocodile
                - - Orinoco crocodile
                  - American crocodile

== Characteristics ==
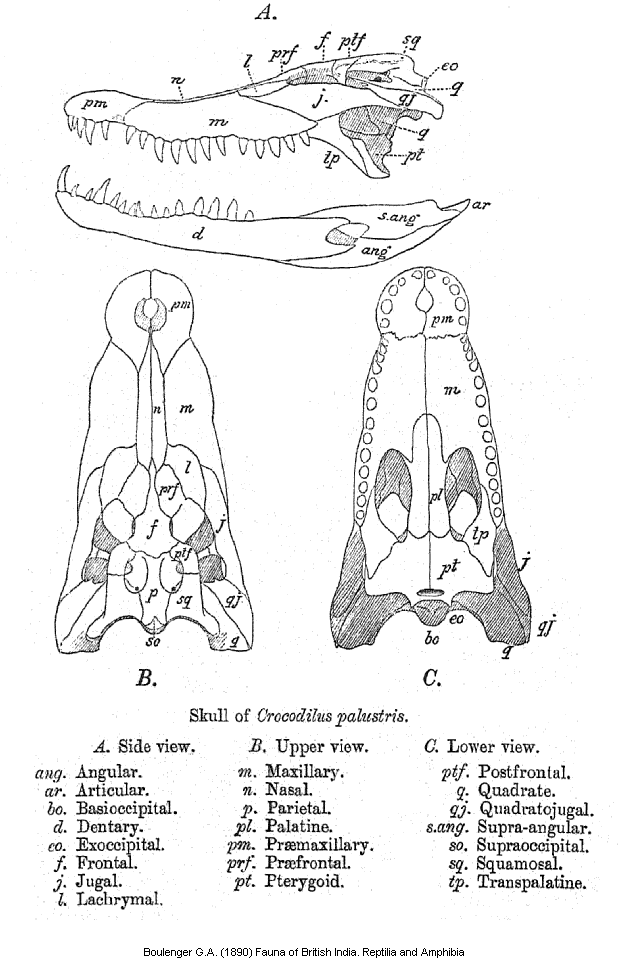
Illustration of mugger crocodile skull

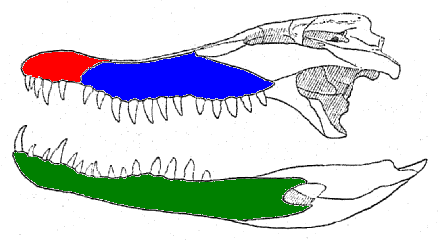
Illustration of mugger dentition

Mugger crocodile hatchlings are pale olive with black spots. Adults are dark olive to grey or brown. The head is rough without any ridges and large scutes around the neck that is well separated from the back; the scutes usually form four, rarely six longitudinal series and 16 or 17 transverse series. The limbs have keeled scales with serrated fringes on the outer edges, and outer toes are extensively webbed. The snout is slightly longer than broad with 19 upper teeth on each side. The symphysis of the lower jaw extends to the level of the fourth or fifth tooth. The premaxillary suture on the palate is nearly straight or curved forwards, and the nasal bones separate the premaxilla above.

The mugger crocodile is considered a medium-sized crocodilian, but has the broadest snout among living crocodiles. It has a powerful tail and webbed feet. Its visual, hearing and smelling senses are acute. Adult female muggers are 2 to 2.5 m (6.6 to 8.2 ft) on average; males usually measure 3 to 3.5 m (9.8 to 11.5 ft), but rarely reach a length of 5 m (16 ft). The two largest known muggers measured 5.63 m (18.5 ft) and were killed in Sri Lanka. One male mugger caught in Pakistan of about 3 m (9.8 ft) weighed 195 kg (430 lb).

One individual weighing 207 kg (456 lb) had a bite force of 7,295 N (1,640 lb_{f}).

== Distribution and habitat ==
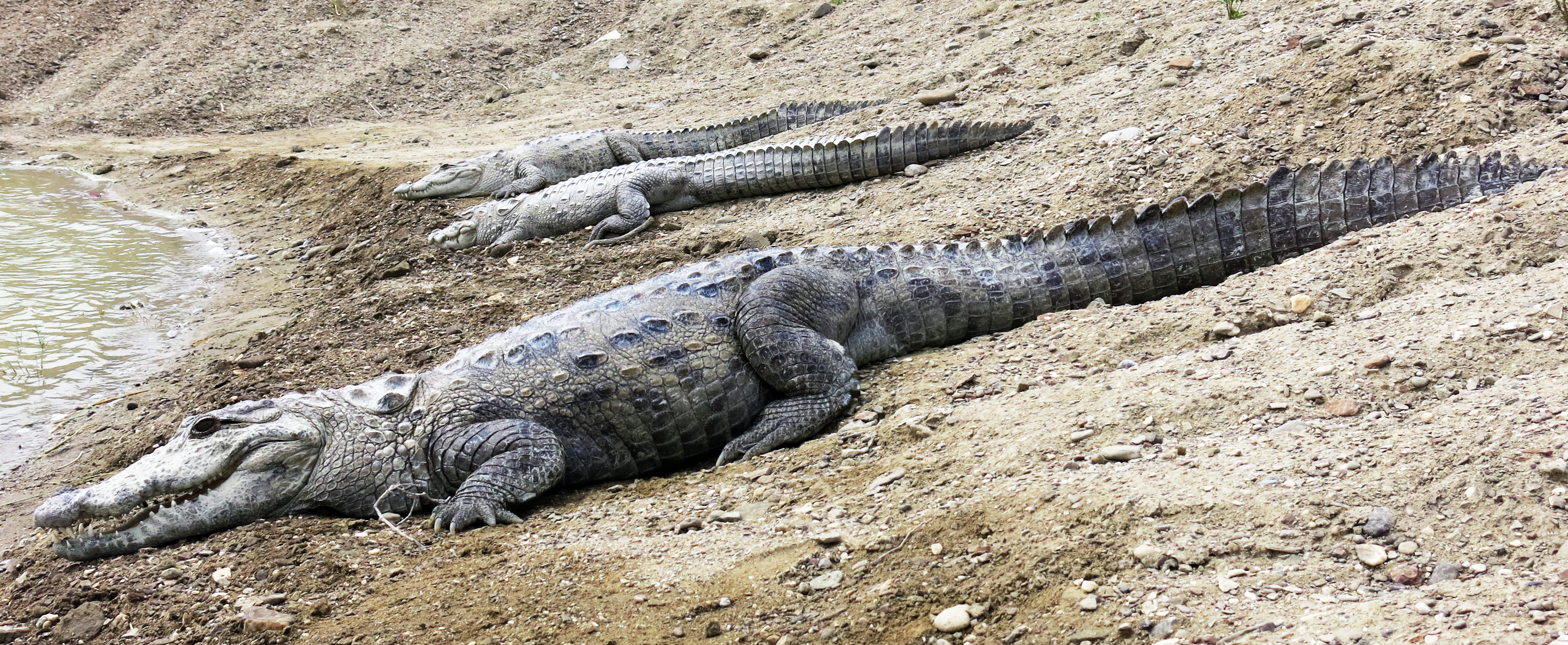
Mugger crocodiles in Chabahar County, Iran

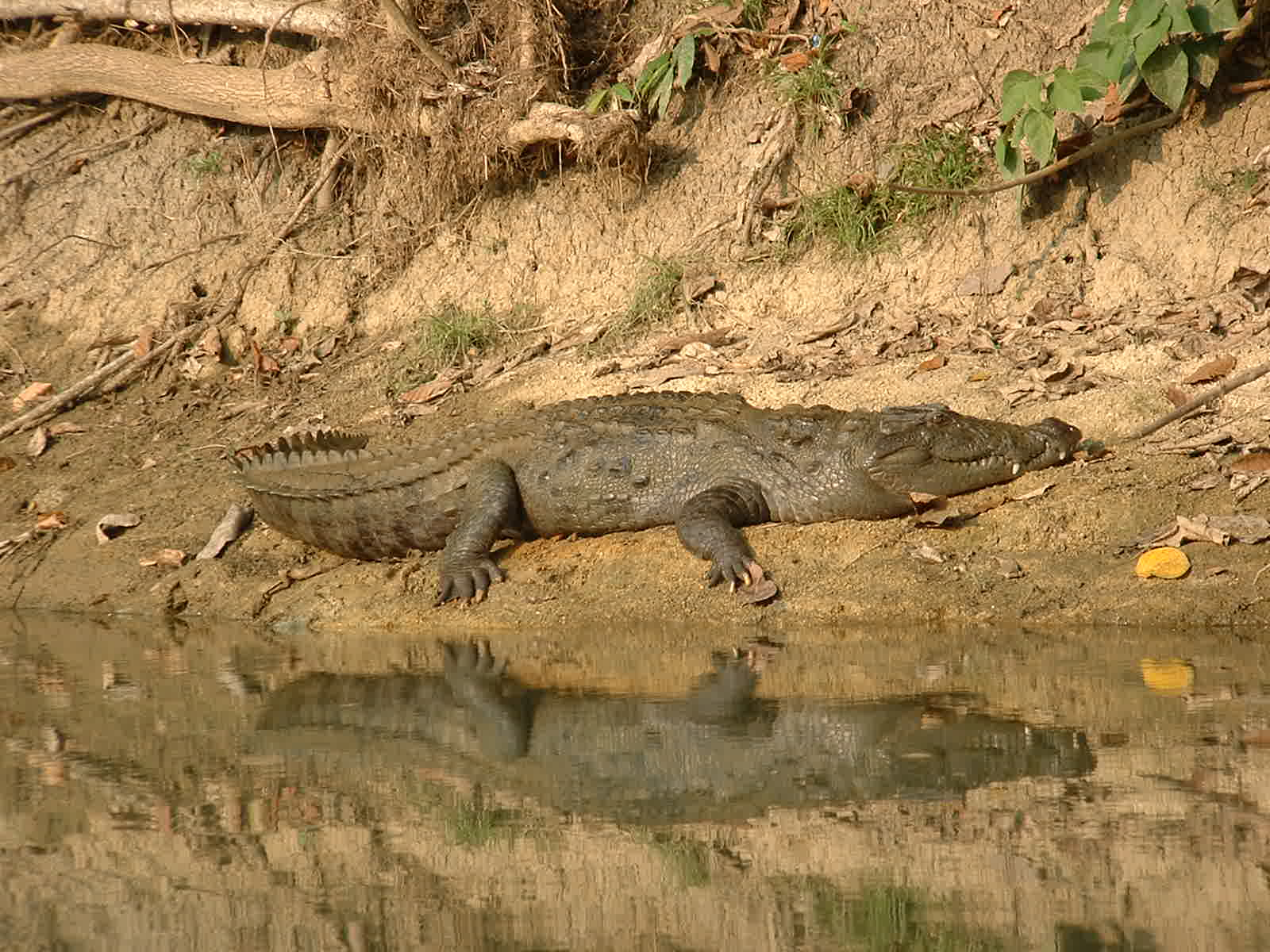
A mugger basking in Chitwan National Park, Nepal

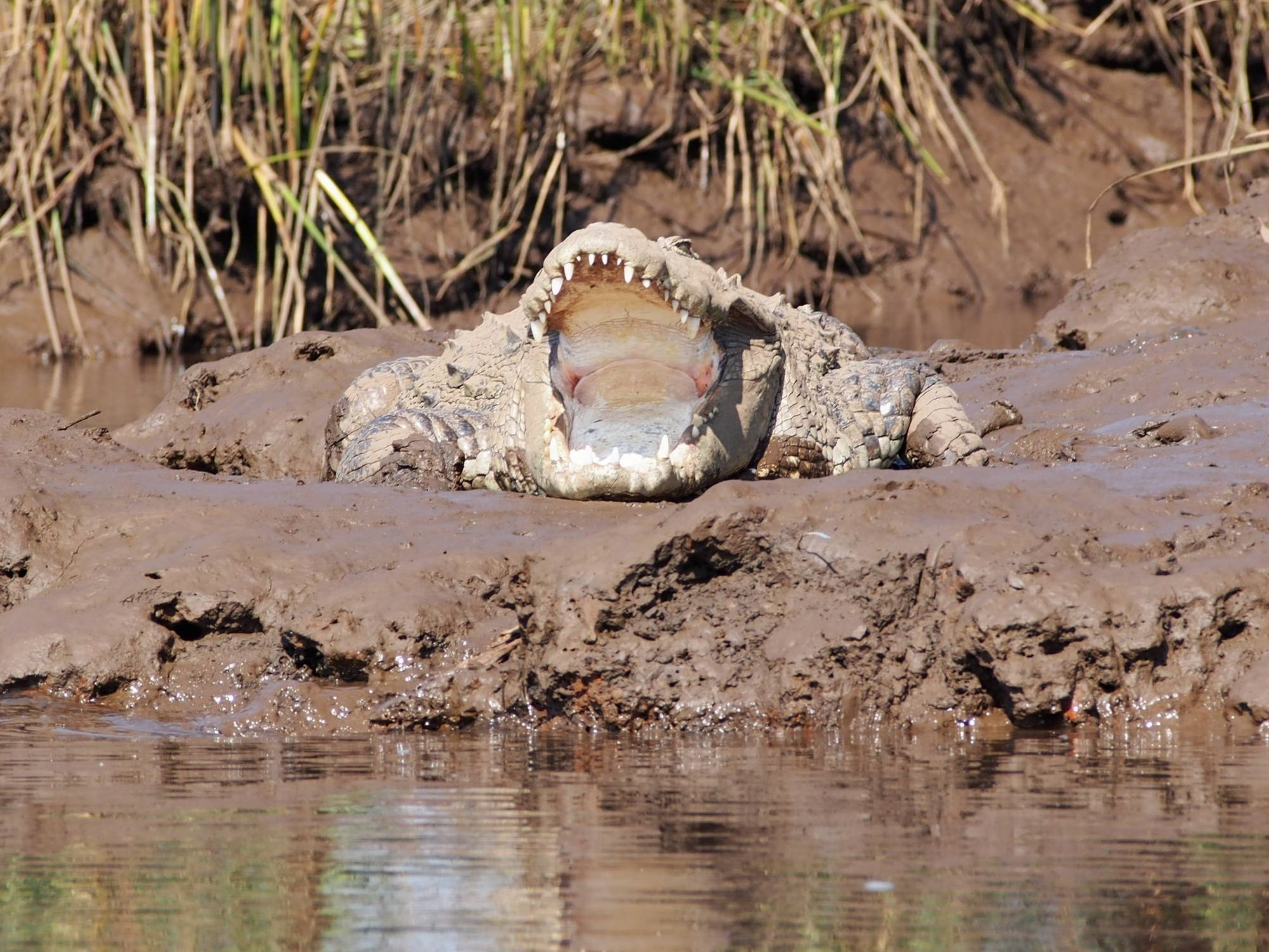
A mugger on the banks of Vashishti River, Maharashtra

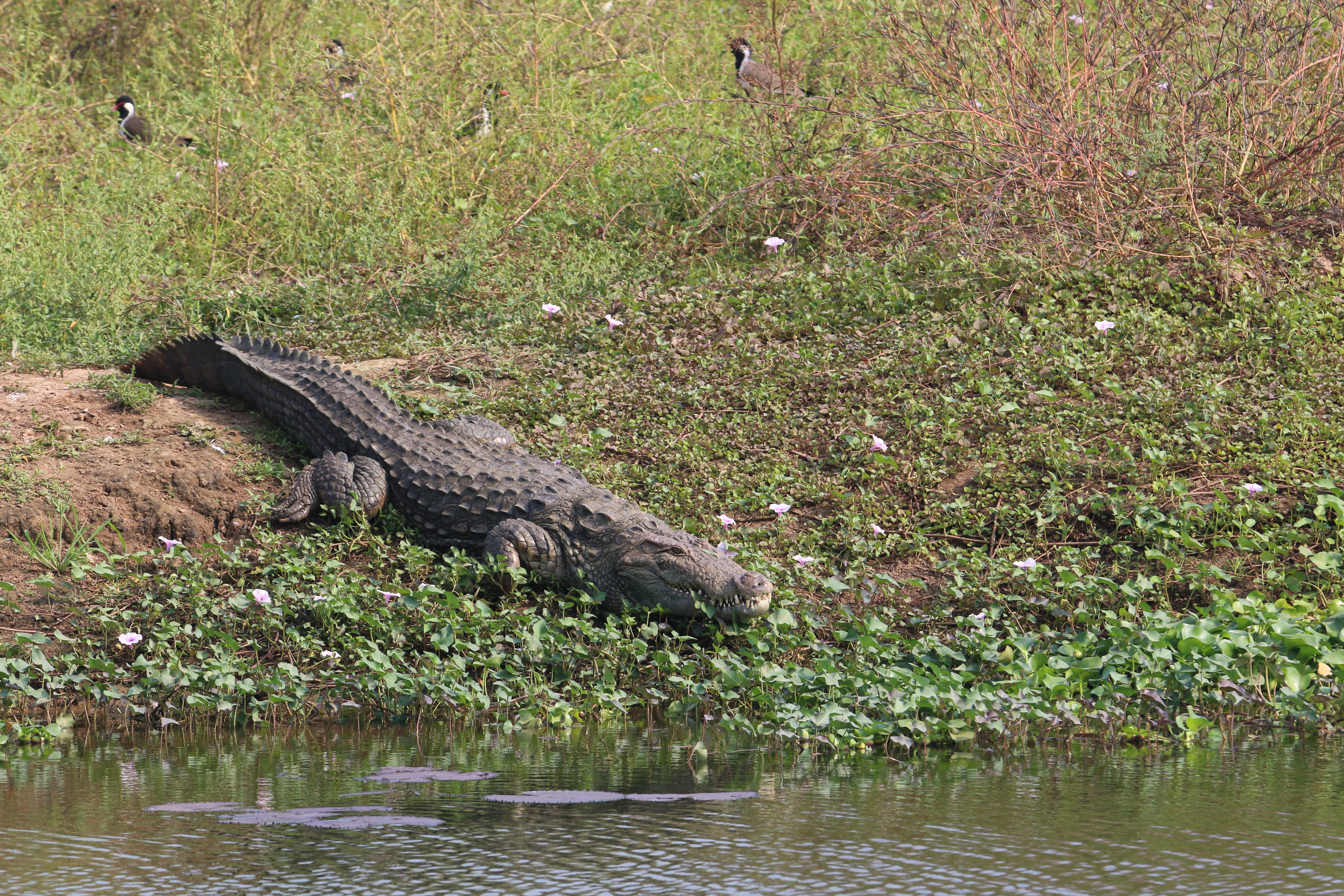
Mugger in Malataj, Gujarat

The mugger crocodile occurs in southern Iran, Pakistan, Nepal, India and Sri Lanka up to an elevation of 420 m (1,380 ft). It inhabits freshwater lakes, rivers and marshes, prefers slow-moving, shallow water bodies, and also thrives in artificial reservoirs and irrigation canals.

In Iran, the mugger occurs along rivers in Sistan and Baluchestan Province along the Iran–Pakistan border. A population of around 200 mugger crocodiles lives on the Iranian Makran coast near Chabahar. Due to human activity and a long drought in the late 1990s and early 2000s, it had been pushed to the brink of extinction. Following several tropical cyclones in 2007 and 2010, much of the habitat of the mugger crocodiles has been restored as formerly dry lakes and hamuns were flooded again.

In Pakistan, a small population lives in 21 ponds around Dasht River; in the winter of 2007–08, 99 individuals were counted. By 2017, the population had declined to 25 individuals. In Sindh Province, small mugger populations occur in wetlands of Deh Akro-2 and Nara Desert Wildlife Sanctuary, near Chotiari Dam, in the Nara Canal and around Haleji lake.

In Nepal's Terai, it occurs in the wetlands of Shuklaphanta and Bardia National Parks, Ghodaghodi Tal, Chitwan National Park and Koshi Tappu Wildlife Reserve. In the Rapti River, it was mostly observed basking on sandy banks with slopes of 15–25°.

In India, it occurs in:

- Rajasthan along the Chambal, Ken and Son Rivers, and in Ranthambore National Park
- Gujarat along the Vishwamitri River and several reservoirs and lakes in Kutch
- Madhya Pradesh's National Chambal Sanctuary
- Uttarakhand's Rajaji National Park, Corbett Tiger Reserve and Lansdowne Forest Division
- Uttar Pradesh's Katarniaghat and Kishanpur Wildlife Sanctuaries
- Odisha's Simlipal National Park and along Mahanadi and Sabari Rivers In 2019, 82 individuals were recorded in the river systems of Simlipal National Park.
- Telangana's Manjira Wildlife Sanctuary
- Maharashtra's Kadavi and Warna Rivers, and Savitri River in Raigad District.
- Goa's Salaulim Reservoir, Zuari River and in small lakes
- Karnataka along Kaveri and Kabini Rivers, in Ranganthittu Bird Sanctuary, Nagarhole National Park and Tungabhadra Reservoir
- Kerala's Parambikulam Reservoir and Neyyar Wildlife Sanctuary
- Tamil Nadu's Amaravathi Reservoir, Moyar and Kaveri rivers.

In Sri Lanka, it occurs in Wilpattu, Yala and Bundala National Parks. Between 1991 and 1996, it was recorded in another 102 localities.

In Bangladesh, it was historically present in the northern parts of the Sundarbans, where four to five captive individuals survived in an artificial pond by the 1980s. It is possibly locally extinct in the country. In Bhutan, it became extinct in the late 1960s, but a few captive-bred individuals were released in the Manas River in the late 1990s. It is considered locally extinct in Myanmar.

== Behaviour and ecology ==
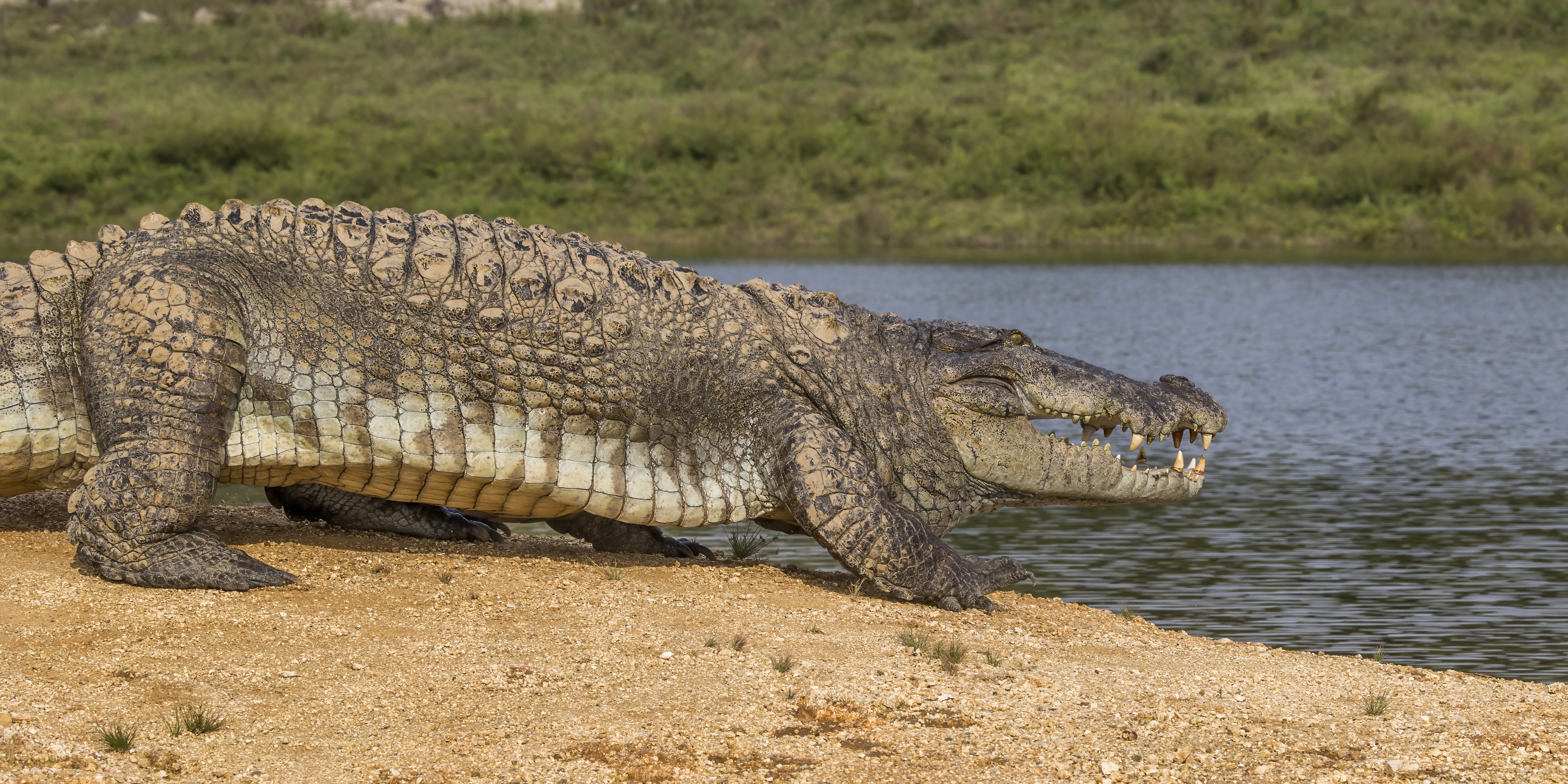
Mugger walking, Sri Lanka

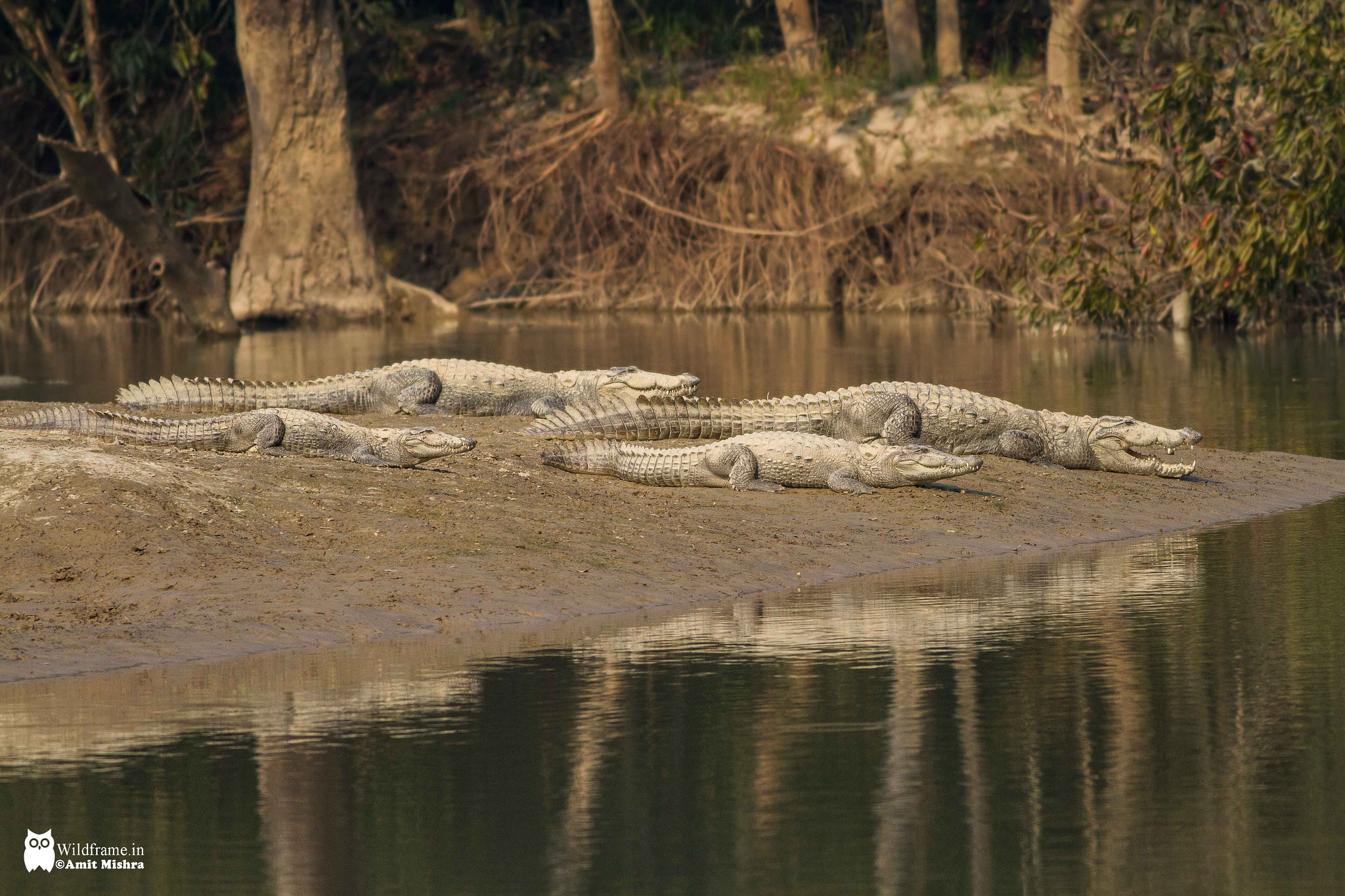

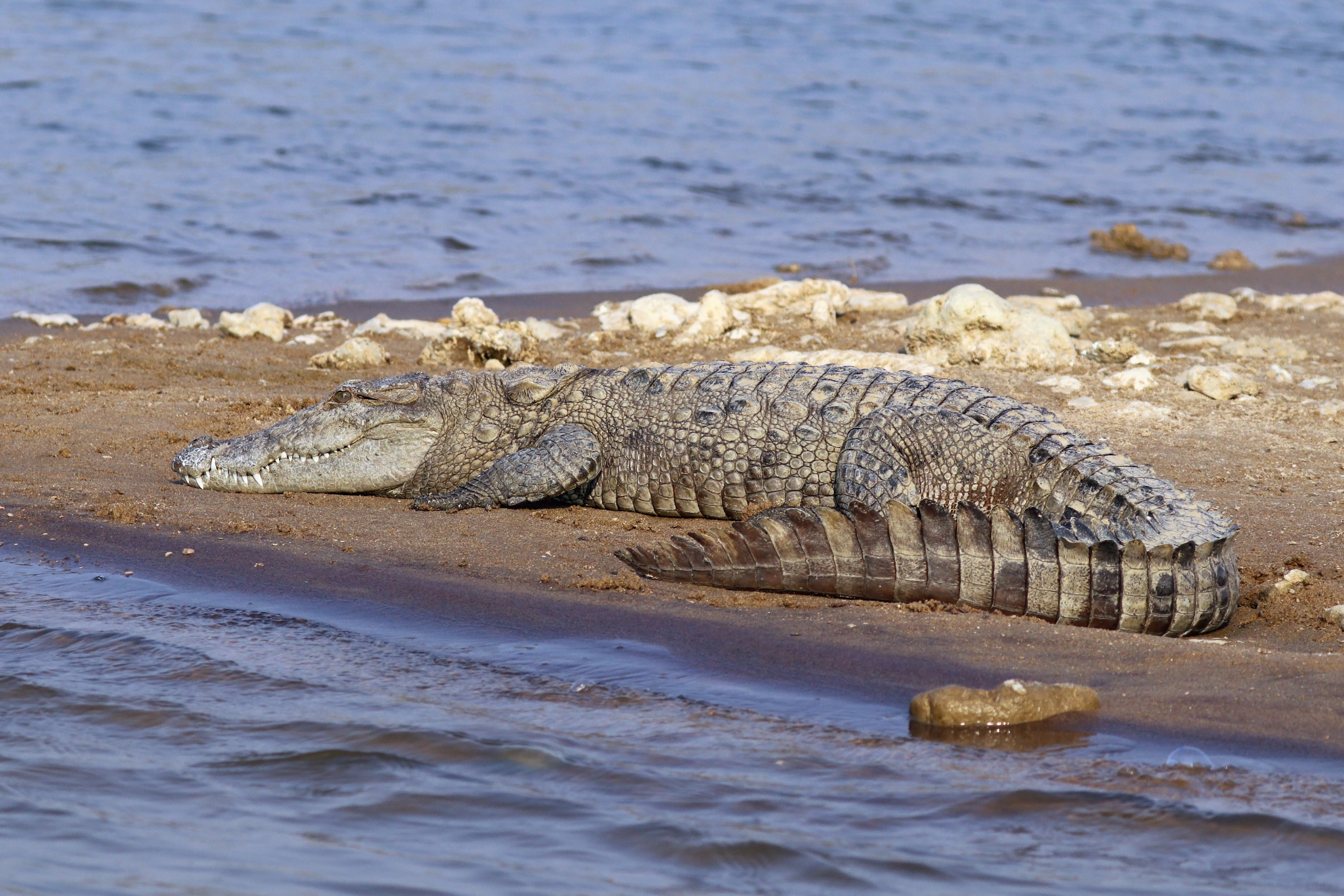
Muggers basking on sand banks

The mugger crocodile is a powerful swimmer that uses its tail and hind feet to move forward, change direction and submerge. It belly-walks, with its belly touching ground, at the bottom of waterbodies and on land. During the hot dry season, it walks over land at night to find suitable wetlands and spends most of the day submerged in water. During the cold season it basks on riverbanks, individuals are tolerant of others during this period. Territorial behaviour increases during the mating season.

Like all crocodilians, the mugger crocodile is a thermoconformer and has an optimal body temperature of 30 to 35 °C (86 to 95 °F) and risks dying of freezing or hyperthermia when exposed to temperatures below 5 °C (41 °F) or above 38 °C (100 °F), respectively. It digs burrows to retreat from extreme temperatures and other harsh climatic conditions. Burrows are between 0.6 and 6 m (2.0 and 19.7 ft) deep, with entrances above the water level and a chamber at the end that is big enough to allow the mugger to turn around. Temperatures inside remains constant at 19.2 to 29 °C (66.6 to 84.2 °F), depending on region.

=== Hunting and diet ===
The mugger crocodile preys on fish, snakes, turtles, birds and mammals including monkeys, squirrels, rodents, otters and dogs. It also scavenges on dead animals. During dry seasons, muggers walk many kilometers over land in search of water and prey. Hatchlings feed mainly on insects such as beetles, but also on crabs and shrimp and on vertebrates later on. It seizes and drags potential prey approaching watersides into the water, when the opportunity arises. Adult muggers were observed feeding on a flapshell turtle and a tortoise. Subadult and adult muggers favour fish, but also prey on small to medium-sized ungulates up to the size of chital (Axis axis). At the Chambal River, muggers have attacked water buffaloes, cattle and goats. In Bardia National Park, a mugger was observed caching a chital kill beneath the roots of a tree and returning to its basking site; a part of the deer was still wedged among the roots on the next day. In the same national park, a mugger caught a brown fish owl (Ketupa zeylonensis); several instances of water bird feathers in mugger dung have been reported. Muggers have also been observed preying and feeding on pythons. In Yala National Park, a mugger killed a large Indian pangolin (Manis crassicaudata) and devoured pieces over several hours.

=== Tool use ===
Mugger crocodiles have been documented using lures to hunt birds. This means they are among the first reptiles recorded to use tools. By balancing sticks and branches on their heads, they lure birds that are looking for nesting material. This strategy is particularly effective during the nesting season.

=== Reproduction ===
Female muggers obtain sexual maturity at a body length of around 1.8–2.2 m (5 ft 11 in – 7 ft 3 in) at the age of about 6.5 years, and males at around 2.6 m (8 ft 6 in) body length. The reproduction cycle starts earliest in November at the onset of the cold season with courtship and mating. Between February and June, females dig 35–56 cm (14–22 in) deep holes for nesting between 1 and 2,000 m (3 ft 3 in and 6,561 ft 8 in) away from the waterside. They lay up to two clutches with 8 –46 eggs each. Eggs weigh 128 g (4.5 oz) on average. Laying of one clutch usually takes less than half an hour. Thereafter, females scrape sand over the nest to close it. Males have been observed to assist females in digging and protecting nest sites. Hatching season is two months later, between April and June in south India, and in Sri Lanka between August and September. Then females excavate the young, pick them up in their snouts and take them to the water. Both females and males protect the young for up to one year.

Healthy hatchlings develop at a temperature range of 28–33 °C (82–91 °F). Sex ratio of hatched eggs depends on incubation temperature and exposure of nests to sunshine. Only females develop at constant temperatures of 28–31 °C (82–88 °F), and only males at 32.5 °C (90.5 °F). Percentage of females in a clutch decreases at constant temperatures between 32.6 and 33 °C (90.7 and 91.4 °F), and of males between 31 and 32.4 °C (87.8 and 90.3 °F). Temperature in natural nests is not constant but varies between nights and days. Foremost females hatch in natural early nests when initial temperature inside nests ranges between 26.4 and 28.9 °C (79.5 and 84.0 °F). The percentage of male hatchlings increases in late nests located in sunny sites. Hatchlings are 26–31 cm (10–12 in) long and weigh 75 g (2.6 oz) on average when one month old. They grow about 4.25 cm (1.67 in) per month and reach a body length of 90–170 cm (35–67 in) when two years old.

=== Sympatric predators ===
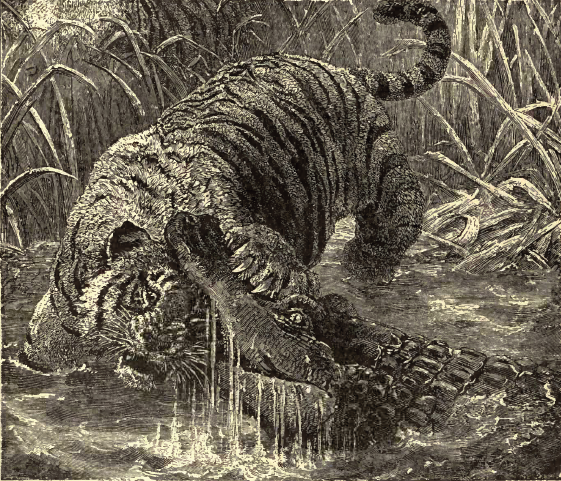
Mugger crocodile attacking a tiger, 1901

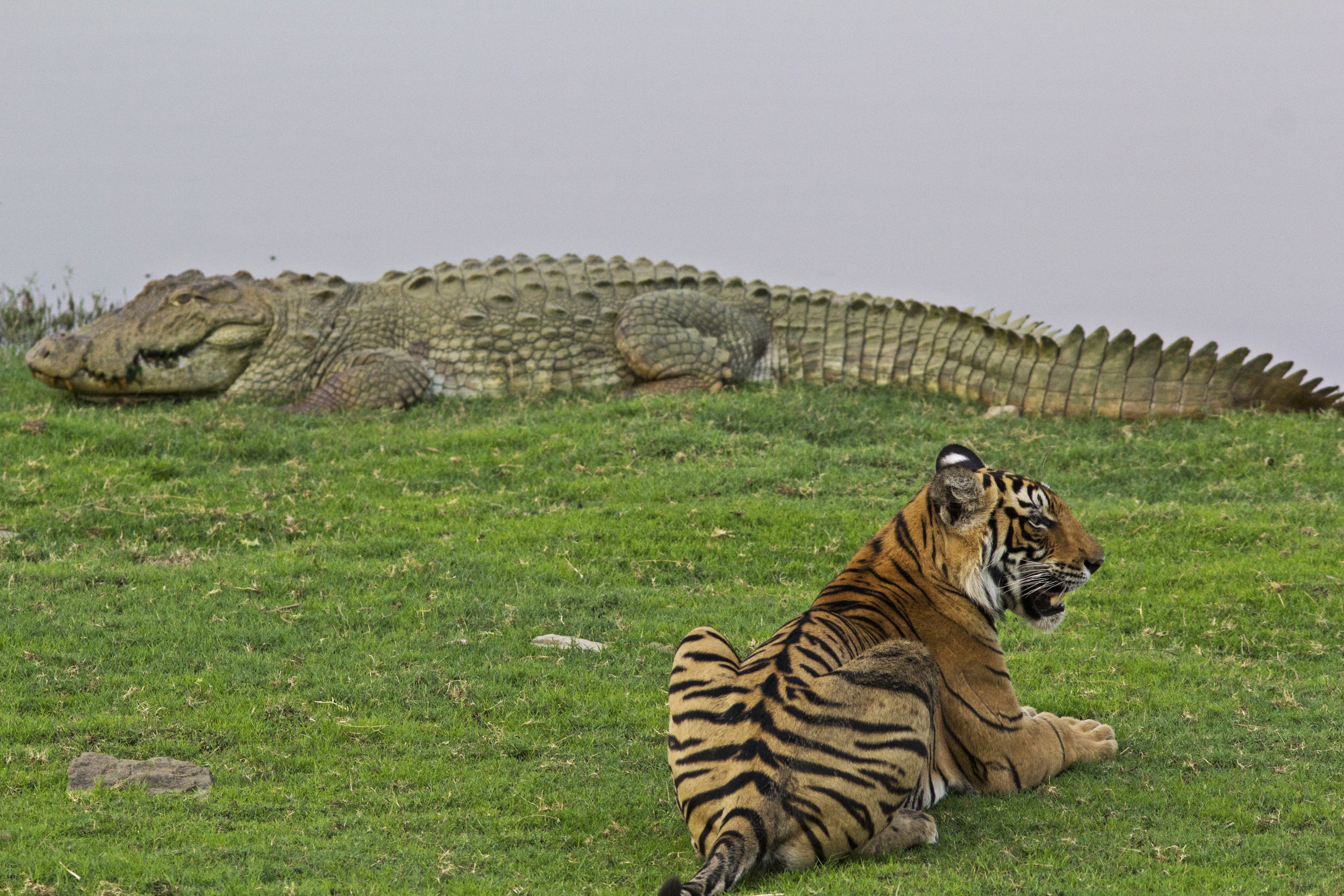
A mugger crocodile and a tiger in Ranthambore National Park

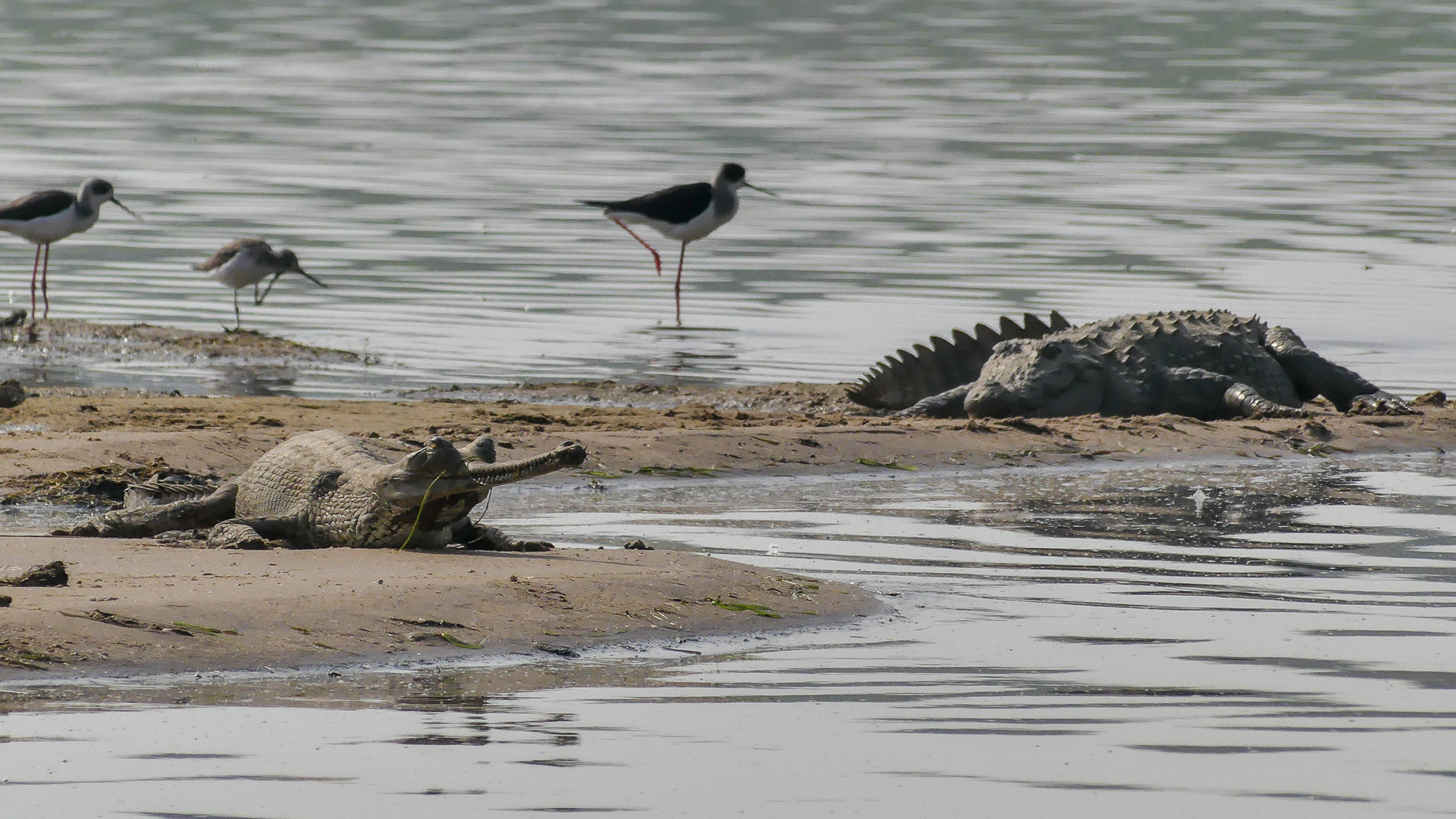
Mugger crocodile and gharial

The distribution of the mugger crocodile overlaps with that of the saltwater crocodile in a few coastal areas, but it barely enters brackish water and prefers shallow waterways. It is an apex predator in freshwater ecosystems. It is sympatric with the gharial (Gavialis gangeticus) in the Rapti and Narayani Rivers, in the eastern Mahanadi, and in tributaries of the Ganges and Yamuna rivers.

The Bengal tiger (Panthera tigris tigris) occasionally fights mugger crocodiles off prey and rarely preys on adult mugger crocodiles in Ranthambore National Park. The Asiatic lion (Panthera leo leo) sometimes preys on crocodiles on the banks of the Kamleshwar Dam in Gir National Park during dry, hot months.

== Threats ==
The mugger crocodile is threatened by habitat destruction because of conversion of natural habitats for agricultural and industrial use. As humans encroach into its habitat, the incidents of conflict increase. Muggers are entangled in fishing equipment and drown, and are killed in areas where fishermen perceive them as competition. Major wetlands in Pakistan were drained in the 1990s by dams and channels to funnel natural streams and agricultural runoffs into rivers.

In Gujarat, two muggers were found killed, one in 2015 with the tail cut off and internal organs missing; the other in 2017, also with the tail cut off. The missing body parts indicate that the crocodiles were sacrificed in superstitious practices or used as aphrodisiacs. Between 2005 and 2018, 38 mugger crocodiles were victims of traffic accidents on roads and railway tracks in Gujarat; 29 were found dead, four died during treatment, and five were returned to the wild after medical care. In 2017, a dead mugger was found on a railway track in Rajasthan.

== Conservation ==
The mugger crocodile is listed in CITES Appendix I, hence international commercial trade is prohibited. It has been listed as Vulnerable on the IUCN Red List since 1982. By 2013, less than 8,700 mature individuals were estimated to live in the wild and no population unit to comprise more than 1,000 individuals.

In India, it has been protected since 1972 under Schedule I of the Wildlife Protection Act, 1972, which prohibits catching, killing and transporting a crocodile without a permit; offenders face imprisonment and a fine. In Sri Lanka, it was listed in Schedule IV of the Fauna & Flora Protection Ordinance in 1946, which allowed for shooting one crocodile with a permit. Today, it is strictly protected, but law enforcement in Sri Lanka is lacking. In Iran, the mugger crocodile is listed as endangered and has been legally protected since 2013; capturing and killing a crocodile is punished with a fine of 100 million Iranian rials.

Since large muggers occasionally take livestock, this leads to conflict with local people living close to mugger habitat. In Maharashtra, local people are compensated for loss of close relatives and livestock. Local people in Baluchestan respect the mugger crocodile as a water living creature and do not harm it. If an individual kills livestock, the owner is compensated for the loss. The mugger crocodile is translocated in severe conflict cases.

A total of 1,193 captive bred muggers were released to restock populations in 28 protected areas in India between 1978 and 1992. Production of new offspring was halted by the Indian Government in 1994.

== In culture ==
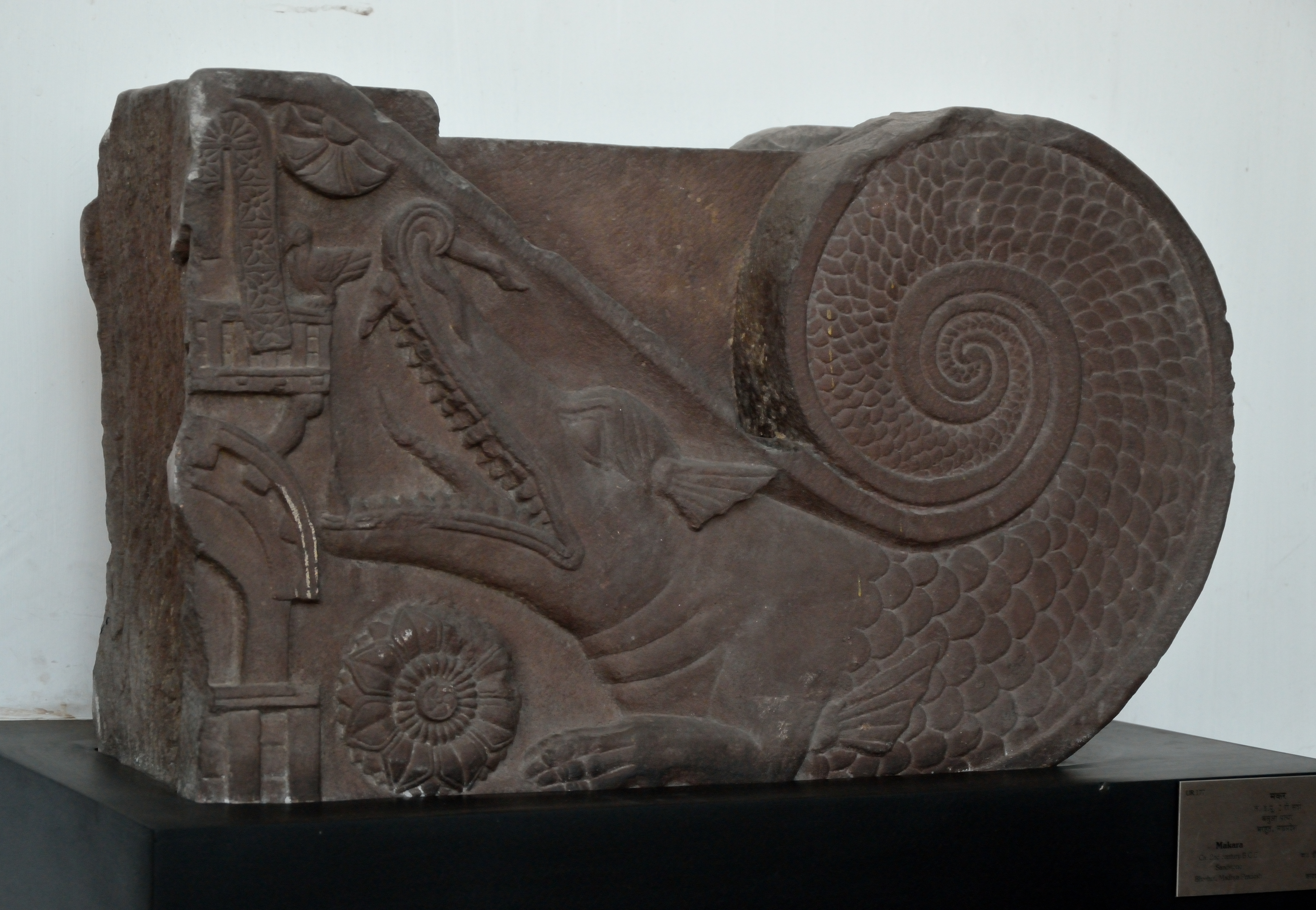
Makara on a beam from the Bharhut Stupa, now in the Indian Museum, Kolkata

The Sanskrit word मकर (makara) refers to the crocodile and a mythical crocodile-like animal. The Hindi word for crocodile is मगर (magar). In English language, both names mugger and magar were used around the turn of the 20th century. The names 'marsh crocodile' and 'broad-snouted crocodile' have been used since the late 1930s.

The crocodile is acknowledged as the prototype of the makara and symbolises both the fructifying and the destructive powers of the rivers. It is the animal vehicle of the Vedic deity Varuna and of several nature spirits called yakshas. In Hindu mythology, it represents virility as a vehicle of Ganga and as an emblem of Kamadeva. A stone carving of a mugger crocodile was part of a beam of a gateway to the Bharhut Stupa built around 100 BC.

The traditional biography of the Indian saint Adi Shankara includes an incident where he is grabbed by a crocodile in the Kaladi river, which releases him only after his mother reluctantly let him choose the ascetic path of a Sannyasa. The Muslim saint Pir Mangho is said to have taken care of crocodiles and created a stream to trickle out of a rock near Karachi in the 13th century. This place was later walled around, and about 40 mugger crocodiles were kept in the reservoir called Magar Talao in the 1870s; they were fed by both Hindu and Muslim pilgrims. Mugger crocodiles have also been kept in tanks near Hindu temples built in the vicinity of rivers; these crocodiles are considered sacred. In the early 20th century, young married women fed the crocodiles in Khan Jahan Ali's Tank in Jessore in the hope of being blessed with children.

Vasava, Gamit and Chodhri tribes in Gujarat worship the crocodile god Mogra Dev asking for children, good crops and milk yield of their cows. They carve wooden statues symbolising Mogra Dev and mount them on poles. Their offerings during the installation ceremony include rice, milk, wine, heart and liver of a chicken, and a mixture of vermillion, oil and coconut fibres. Fatal attacks of mugger crocodiles on humans were documented in Gujarat and Maharashtra, but they rarely consumed the victims who died of drowning.

A fable from the Jataka tales of Buddhist traditions features a clever monkey outwitting a crocodile. Three folktales feature crocodiles and jackals. A mugger crocodile is one of the characters in The Undertakers, a chapter of The Second Jungle Book. The children's book Adventures of a Nepali Frog features the character Mugger, the crocodile who lives by the Rapti River in Chitwan National Park.

=== Etymology ===
The Sanskrit word makara is thought to derive from Proto-Dravidian *nek-V-ḷ- meaning "crocodile", with cognates in Kannada negal, negale ("alligator"), Tulu negaḷu ("alligator"), and Telugu negaḍu ("a marine animal which entangles swimmers"). This may have been derived from the root *neka- ("to rise, fly, jump, leap"), referring to the crocodile's jumping behavior when catching prey.

Alternatively, the word is traced to Proto-Dravidian *mokaray- ("crocodile"), a verbal noun from *mok- / *moṅku- meaning "to eat greedily, devour" (DEDR 5127 + 4897). This etymology explains widespread cognates including Bengali makar, Hindi magar, Tamil makaram and Telugu makaramu. The phonological change from *mokara to makara reflects the absence of the short -o- vowel in early Indo-Aryan languages.

The Dravidian origin reflects early language contact, as Aryan speakers migrating from the Eurasian Steppe would not have had inherited words for crocodiles, adopting local terms upon reaching South Asia.

== See also ==
- Crocodiles in India
- List of reptiles of South Asia
