= List of acronyms: T =

This list contains acronyms, initialisms, and pseudo-blends that begin with the letter T.

For the purposes of this list:

- acronym = an abbreviation pronounced as if it were a word, e.g., SARS = severe acute respiratory syndrome, pronounced to rhyme with cars
- initialism = an abbreviation pronounced wholly or partly using the names of its constituent letters, e.g., CD = compact disc, pronounced cee dee
- pseudo-blend = an abbreviation whose extra or omitted letters mean that it cannot stand as a true acronym, initialism, or portmanteau (a word formed by combining two or more words).

(a) = acronym, e.g.: SARS – (a) severe acute respiratory syndrome
(i) = initialism, e.g.: CD – (i) compact disc
(p) = pseudo-blend, e.g.: UNIFEM – (p) United Nations Development Fund for Women
(s) = symbol (none of the above, representing and pronounced as something else; for example: MHz – megahertz)

Some terms are spoken as either acronym or initialism, e.g., VoIP, pronounced both as voyp and V-O-I-P.

(Main list of acronyms)

- T – (s) Tera – tesla – tritium

== TA ==
- ta – (s) Tamil language (ISO 639-1 code)
- Ta – (s) Tantalum
- TA
  - (i) Target Acquisition
  - Teaching Assistant
  - (s) teraampere
  - (i) Territorial Army (UK)
  - (s) Tristan da Cunha (ISO 3166 digram)
- TAA
  - (i) Transparency Anti-Aliasing
  - (a) Trans Australia Airlines
- TAAC – (i/a) Trans America Athletic Conference, the original name for the US college sports league now known as the ASUN Conference
- TAACOM – (p) U.S. Theater Army Area Command
- TAADCOORD – (p) Theatre Army Air Defence Co-ordinator
- TAAR – (i) Trace Amine-Associated Receptor
- TAC – (a) U.S. Tactical Air Command (1946–1992)
- TACAMO – (p) Take Charge and Move Out (U.S. military)
- TACAN – (p) Tactical Air Navigation
- TACC
  - (i) Tactical Air Control Centre
  - (USAF) Tanker Airlift Control Center
- TACCO – (p) Tactical Coordinator
- TACCSF – (i) U.S. Theater Aerospace Command & Control Simulation Facility
- TACDAR – (p) Tactical Detection And Reporting
- TACP – (i) Tactical Air Control Party – Technology Applications Certification Program
- TACSOP – (p) Tactical SOP (Standing Operating Procedure)
- TADIL – (p) Tactical Digital Information Link
- TADL – (a) Tactical Air Data Link ("taddle")
- TADSS – (i) Training Aids, Devices, Simulators, and Simulations
- TAF - (i) Trading Activity Fee assessed by FINRA to recover the costs of supervising and regulating firms.
- tah – (s) Tahitian language (ISO 639-2 code)
- TAI – (i) Target[ed] Area of Interest
- TAJ – (i) Tom and Jerry
- TAJT – (i) Tom and Jerry Tales
- TALES – (a) Technical Advice and Lexicon for Enabling Simulation
- tam – (s) Tamil language (ISO 639-2 code)
- TAN – (s) Tanzania (IOC and FIFA trigram, but not ISO 3166)
- TANJ – (a) There Ain't No Justice (used as expletive in the Ringworld novels)
- TANP – (i) Terrain-Aware Network Planner
- TANSTAAFL – (a) There Ain't No Such Thing As A Free Lunch (coined by author Robert A. Heinlein in his The Moon Is a Harsh Mistress)
- TAPPS – (a) Texas Association of Private and Parochial Schools
- TARDIS – (a) Time And Relative Dimension In Space (from Doctor Who)
- TARP – (a) Transparency Accountability Rights for Parents (coined by Karen Plumridge, founder of Black Ribbon Gold Heart)
- TAROT – (a) Télescope à action rapide pour les objets transitoires (French, "Transient Object Rapid Action Telescope")
- TAS – Tasmania (postal symbol)
- TASER – (a) Thomas A. Swift's Electric Rifle
- TASM – (i) Tactical Air-to-Surface Missile
- tat – (s) Tatar language (ISO 639-2 code)
- TAT – (i) Tourism Authority of Thailand
- TATP – (p) TriAcetone TriPeroxide
- TADC - (i) The Amazing Digital Circus

== TB ==
- Tb – (s) Terbium
- TB – (p) Tuberculosis
- TBA – (i) to be announced
- TBBPA – (p) TetraBromoBisPhenol-A
- TBC – (i) to be confirmed, to be continued
- TBD – (i) "to be documented", "to be determined", or "to be decided"
- TBD – (i) Torpedo Boat Destroyer
- TBF – to be fair
- TBGRI – (i) Tropical Botanic Garden and Research Institute, India
- TBH – (i) to be honest
- TBL – (i) Turkish Basketball League
- TBM – (i) tactical ballistic missile, theatre ballistic missile
- TBS – (i) Turner Broadcasting System
- TBT – (p) Tributyltin

== TC ==
- TCC – (s) Tarrant County College
- Tc – (s) Technetium
- TC – (s) Teracoulomb – Turks and Caicos (ISO 3166 digram) – United Arab Emirates (FIPS 10-4 country code; from Trucial Coast States)
- TCA – (i) Transformational Communications Architecture – (s) Turks and Caicos (ISO 3166 trigram)
- TCAS – (i) Traffic Collision Avoidance System
- TCAA – (i) Top Counter-Assault Agents
- TCBY - (i) The Country's Best Yogurt
- TCCCS – (i/a) Tactical Command, Control, and Communications System ("ticks")
- TCD – (s) Chad (ISO 3166 trigram)
- TCG – (i) Trusted Computing Group – Türkiye Cumhuriyeti Gemisi
- TCHD – (i) Truck Cargo Heavy Duty
- TCL – (i) Tool Command Language
- TCM – (i) Turner Classic Movies
- TCP – (i) Traffic Control Point – Transmission Control Protocol – Trichlorophenol
- TCU – (i) Texas Christian University
- TCWMS – (i) Tele-Center Workforce Management System
- TCW – (i) Tasty Coma Wife

== TE ==
- te – (s) Telugu language (ISO 639-1 code)
- Te – (s) Tellurium
- TE – (i) Tactical Exploitation – (p) Testosterone to Epitestosterone ratio – (i) Tight end (American football; position generally not used in modern Canadian football)
- TEAL – (a) Tasman Empire Airways Limited
- Team – (a) Together everyone achieves more
- TEAMS – (a) The East African Marine System (fiber optic cable)
- TED – (a) Technology Entertainment Design prize
- TEEL – parts of a body paragraph in an essay: * T - Topic sentence E - Explanation E - Evidence L - Link
- TEETH – (a) Tried Everything Else, Try Homeopathy (medical diagnosis in-joke)
- tel – (s) Telugu language (ISO 639-2 code)
- TEL – (a/i) Transporter, Erector and Launcher
- TELAR – (a) Transporter, Erector, Launcher And Radar
- TEMO – (a) Training, Exercise, and Military Operations
- TENCAP – (p) Tactical Exploitation of National Capabilities
- TER's(Stargate) – Transphase Emission Rods
- TERS – (i) Tactical Event Reporting System
- TES – (i) Tactical Event System
- TEST – (a) Thesaurus of Engineering and Scientific Terms
- TEU – (i) Twenty-foot equivalent unit (cargo capacity)
- TeVeS – (p) Tensor Vector Scalar theory

== TF ==
- TF –
  - (s) French Southern Territories (ISO 3166 digram)
  - (i) Task Force
  - (s) Terafarad
  - (?) Too Far
  - (i) Team fortress (hence TF2 is Team Fortress 2)
  - Transformers
- T/F – (i) True/False (=Yes/No)
- TFG
  - (i) Task Force Games (defunct tabletop game company)
  - Tiny Friendly Giant (automobile engine developed by Koenigsegg)
  - Transferoviar Grup (Romanian railway company)
- TFMPP – (p) Trifluorophenylmethylpiperazine
- TFR – (i) Total Fertility Rate
- TFT – (i) Thin-Film Transistor
- TFTP –
  - (i) Trivial File Transfer Protocol
  - (i) Terrorist Finance Tracking Program

== TG ==
- tg – (s) Tajik language (ISO 639-1 code)
- Tg – (s) Teragram
- TG – (s) Togo (ISO 3166 digram)
- TGA – (s) Tonga (IOC and FIFA trigram, but not ISO 3166)
- TGB – (i) Tres grande bibliothèque (French, "Very Large Library"), a sarcastic nickname for the Bibliothèque nationale de France
- TGIF – (i) Thank God It's Friday, Toes Go In First
- tgk – (s) Tajik language (ISO 639-2 code)
- tgl – (s) Tagalog language (ISO 639-2 code)
- TGO – (s) Togo (ISO 3166 trigram)
- TGT
  - (p) Target (also the ticker symbol for Target Corporation)
  - (i) Ticket Granting Ticket (computer security)
  - (i) Tyrese, Ginuwine, Tank – see TGT (group) for their collaboration
- TGV
  - (i) Tanjong Golden Village (Malaysian cinema chain)
  - (p) Tanora malaGasy Vonona (Malagasy, "Young Malagasies Determined" – political party)
  - (i) Test Generation with Verification
  - Train à grande vitesse (French for "High-Speed Train")

== TH ==
- th – (s) Thai language (ISO 639-1 code)
- Th – (s) Thorium
- TH – (s) Terahenry – Thailand (ISO 3166 and FIPS 10-4 country code digram)
- tha – (s) Thai language (ISO 639-2 code)
- THA – (s) Thailand (ISO 3166 trigram)
- THAAD – (a/i) Terminal High Altitude Area Defence
- THB – (s) Thai baht (ISO 4217 currency code)
- THEGENTRY – (a) The High-End Group of Earth's New Technologies Research Yield
- THEL – (a) Tactical High Energy Laser ACTD
- THG – (p) Tetrahydrogestrinone
- ThG – (p) Graduate of Theology
- THSU - (a) Texas Health and Science University

== TI ==
- ti – (s) Tigrinya language (ISO 639-1 code)
- Ti – (s) Tebi – Titanium
- TI – (s) Tajikistan (FIPS 10-4 country code) – (i) Thermal Imaging – Threat Identification – Training Instructor – Texas Instruments
- TIA – (i) Total Information Awareness initiative
- TIA – (i) Transient Ischemic Attack
- TIALD – (i) Thermal Imaging and Airborne Laser Designation
- TIAA-CREF – (i, pronounced as "T-I-A-A-cref") Teachers Insurance and Annuity Association – College Retirement Equities Fund
- TIBS – (a) Tactical Information Broadcast System
- TIC – (a) Troops In Contact
- TID – (p) Target Identification – (i) ter in die (Latin, "three times daily")
- TIGERS – (a) Topologically Integrated Geographic Encoding and Referencing System
- TIM – (a) Technical Information Memorandum – Technical Interchange Meeting – Toxic Industrial Material – Telecom Italia Mobile
- TIMS – (a) Tactical Internet Management System – The Institute of Management Sciences – The International Molinological Society – Thermal Infrared Multispectral Scanner – Thermal Ionization Mass Spectrometry – Travel Information Management Services – Tuberculosis Information Management System
- TINC – (a) There Is No Cabal
- TINY – That Is, Not You (internet slang)
- TIP – (a) Thermal Identification Panel
- tir – (s) Tigrinya language (ISO 639-2 code)
- tits – Toes in the Sand

== TJ ==
- TJ – (s) Tajikistan (ISO 3166 digram) – Terajoule
- TJD – (i) Truncated Julian Day
- TJK – (s) Tajikistan (ISO 3166 trigram)
- TJS – (s) Tajik somoni (ISO 4217 currency code)

== TK ==
- tk – (s) Turkmen language (ISO 639-1 code)
- TK – (s) Terakelvin – Tokelau (ISO 3166 digram)
- TKBL – (i) Türkiye 1. Kadınlar Basketbol Ligi, the Turkish-language name of the Turkish Women's Basketball League
- TKL – (s) Tokelau (ISO 3166 trigram)
- TKM – (s) Turkmenistan (ISO 3166 trigram)

== TL ==
- tl – (s) Tagalog language (ISO 639-1 code)
- Tl – (s) Thallium
- TLPM – T1 Line Performance Monitor
- TL
  - (i) Team Leader
  - (s) Teralitre
  - Timor-Leste (ISO 3166 digram)
  - (p) ThermoLuminescence
- TL;DR (i) – Too long; didn't read
- TLATOJL – The Life and Times of Juniper Lee
- TLA
  - (i) Three-Letter Abbreviation/Acronym
  - (ii) 'Three-Letter Agency' (i.e. CIA, FBI, NSA, etc.)
  - (i) Temporal light artefacts
- TLAC
  - (i) Total Loss Absorbency Capacity
  - (ii) The Light Aircraft Company
- TLAM – (i) Tomahawk Land Attack Missile
- TLAR
  - (i) That Looks About Right (chat shorthand)
  - (ii) Transporter-Launcher And Radar
- TLC
  - (i) Tender Loving Care
  - The Learning Channel (now known strictly by the initials)
  - Thin-layer chromatography
  - T-Boz, Lefteye, Chilli
  - Tables, Ladders, and Chairs (type of professional wrestling match)
- TLD
  - (i) Thermoluminescent Dosimeter
  - Top-Level Domain
- TLE
  - (i) Temporal light effects
- TLI
  - (i) Temporal light interference
- TLM
  - (i) Traditional Latin Mass
  - Tridentine Latin Mass
  - Transaction Lifecycle Management
  - (i) Temporal light modulation
- TLS
  - (s) Timor-Leste (ISO 3166 trigram)
  - (i) Times Literary Supplement

== TM ==
- Tm
  - (s) Terameter
  - Thulium
- TM
  - (i) Technical Manual
  - Theater Missile
  - Thematic Mapper
  - (p) trademark (often written in small superscript type: ^{TM} or ™)
  - (i) Turing machine
  - (s) Turkmenistan (ISO 3166 digram) Tympanic Membrane
- TMA
  - (i) Terminal Maneuvering Area (restricted flying zone)
  - Texas Medical Association
  - Tristeza y muerte de agave (Spanish, "wilting and death of agave") – a disease affecting the blue agave, from which the popular spirit tequila is produced
- TMAP – (a/i) Texas Medication Algorithm Project
- TMC – (i) The Movie Channel
- TMD – (i) Theater Missile Defense
- TMDK – (i) The Mighty Don't Kneel (Australian professional wrestling stable also active in Japan)
- TMI – (i) Too Much Information
- TMJ – (i) TemporoMandibular Joint (syndrome)
- TMM – (s) Turkmen manat (ISO 4217 currency code)
- TMNT – (i) Teenage Mutant Ninja Turtles
- TMO
  - (i) Table Mountain Observatory
  - Television match official (rugby union)
- TMP
  - (s) East Timor (ISO 3166 trigram; obsolete 2002)
  - (p) Temporary
- TMPG – (i) Transparent Multiplatform Gateway
- TMR – (i) Twin Main Rotors (helicopter type)
- TMS – (i) Transcranial Magnetic Stimulation
- TMT – (i) Thirty Meter Telescope
- TMTOWTDI – (i) There's More Than One Way To Do It (from Perl)
- TMZ – (i) Thirty-Mile Zone, an area in and around Los Angeles considered "local" under entertainment industry union work rules

== TN ==
- tn – (s) Tswana language (ISO 639-1 code)
- TN
  - (s) Tennessee (postal symbol)
  - Teranewton
  - Tonga (FIPS 10-4 country code)
  - Tunisia (ISO 3166 digram)
- TNA – (i) Total Nonstop Action Wrestling, an American professional wrestling promotion
- TND – (s) Tunisian dinar (ISO 4217 currency code)
- TNO – (i) Trans-Neptunian Object
- TNT
  - (i) Thomas Nationwide Transport, an Australian company that was one of the predecessors to the PostNL (previously TNT N.V) and the current TNT Express
  - (p) TriNitroToluene
  - (a/i) Turner Network Television

== TO ==
- to – (s) Tongan language (ISO 639-1 code)
- T/O – (i) Theatre of Operations
- TO
  - (s) Togo (FIPS 10-4 country code)
  - Tonga (ISO 3166 digram)
- TOA
  - (i) Table Of Authorities
  - Total Obligation Authority (accounting)
- TOAD
  - (a) Temporary, Obsolete, Abandoned, or Derelict site (urbanism)
  - Towed Optical Assessment Device
- TOBS – (a) Time of OBServation
- TOC
  - (a/i) Table Of Contents
  - Tactical Operations Centre
  - (i) Temporo-Occipital transition Cortex
  - Top of Concrete
- To-do – (s) To-do-List
- TOG – (s) Togo (IOC and FIFA trigram, but not ISO 3166)
- TOGS – (a) Thermal Observation Gunnery Sight
- TOMS – (a) Total Ozone Mapping Spectrometer (satellite instrument)
- ton – (s) Tongan language (ISO 639-2 code)
- TON – (s) Tonga (ISO 3166 trigram)
- TOP – (s) Tongan pa'anga (ISO 4217 currency code)
- TOS
  - (a) Tape Operating System
  - Terms of service
  - The Original Series, used to distinguish the first Star Trek TV series from other parts of the media franchise
  - Tramiel Operating System
- TOT – (i) Time On Target
- TOW – (a) Tube-launched, Optically tracked, Wire-guided (anti-tank missile)

== TP ==
- TP
  - (s) East Timor (ISO 3166 digram; obsolete 2002)
  - São Tomé and Príncipe (FIPS 10-4 country code)
  - (i) Training Practice
  - Trident Ploughshares
- TPE – (s) Chinese Taipei (IOC and FIFA trigram for the country also known as Taiwan)
- TPI – (i) The point is
- TPO – (p) Thrombopoietin
- TPS – (i) The Pennington School
- TPTB – (i) The Powers That Be (often used to refer to the people responsible for the content of TV series or movies)

== TQ ==
- TQ – (i) Top Qualifier (similar to Pole Position in car racing)

== TR ==
- tr – (s) Turkish language (ISO 639-1 code)
- TR – (s) Turkey (ISO 3166 digram)
- TRA – (i) Technology Readiness Assessment
- TRAC – (p) (U.S. Army) TRADOC Analysis Center
- TRACON – (a) Terminal Radar Approach Control
- TRADOC – (p) (U.S. Army) Training and Doctrine Command
- TRAIN – (p) Tourist Railway Association, Inc.
- TRANSCOM – (p) U.S. Transportation Command
- TRAP – (p) Tactical Receive equipment and related Applications
- TRASANA – (p) TRADOC Systems Analysis Agency
- TRD – (i) Towed Radar Decoy
- TRIGAT – (p) Third Generation Antitank (missile)
- TRIPS - (a) Trade-Related Aspects of Intellectual Property Rights
- TRL – (i) Technology readiness level
- Trp – (s) Troop
- TRP
  - (i) Target Reference Point
  - (p) Time of Reporting
- TRPF – (i) Tendency of the rate of profit to fall
- TRU – (a) Transuranic
- TRUEX – (p) Training in Urban Environment Exercise
- TRW – (i) Thompson Ramo Wooldridge Inc.
- TRY – (s) Turkish lira (ISO 4217 currency code)

== TS ==
- ts – (s) Tsonga language (ISO 639-1 code)
- Ts – (s) Terasecond
- TS
  - (s) Terasiemens
  - Thunderstorm (METAR code)
  - Tunisia (FIPS 10-4 country code)
  - (i) TinySex
  - Transsexual
  - (i) "Tough Sh*t"
- TSA
  - (i) Theatre Storage Area
  - Time Slot Allocation
  - Transportation Security Administration
  - The Salvation Army
- TSCA – (a) Toxic Substances Control Act ("tosca")
- TSEC – (i) Transmission Security Encryption Code
- TSL – (i) Transportation Security Laboratory
- tsn – (s) Tswana language (ISO 639-2 code)
- TSN
  - (i) The Sporting News (historic name of the periodical now known as Sporting News)
  - The Sports Network
- tso – (s) Tsonga language (ISO 639-2 code)
- TSO
  - (i) The Stationery Office (was HMSO until 1996)
  - (U.S.) TRICARE Support Office
  - (i) Trans-Siberian Orchestra (band)
- TSOP
  - (i) Tactical Standing Operation Procedure
  - The Sound of Philadelphia (classic 1970s R&B instrumental)
- TSR – many, including terminate-and-stay-resident (program)
- TSSIA – (i) the subject says it all

== TT ==
- tt – (s) Tatar language (ISO 639-1 code)
- TT
  - (s) Teratesla
  - (i) Terrestrial Time
  - Tourist Trophy (Motorcycle sport)
  - (s) Trinidad and Tobago (ISO 3166 digram)
- TTBAO - Things To Be Aware Of
- TTCT – Torrance Tests of Creative Thinking
- TTD – (s) Trinidad and Tobago dollar (ISO 4217 currency code)
- TTO – (s) Trinidad and Tobago (ISO 3166 trigram)
- TTFN – (i) Ta Ta For Now
- TTL
  - (i) Tax, Title, License
  - (i) Through-the-lens (photography)
  - Time 'till live
  - Time to live
  - Transistor–transistor logic
- TTP
  - (i) Tactics, Techniques, and Procedures
  - Thrombotic thrombocytopenic purpura
  - Trailer Transfer Point
- TTTEAF – Thomas the Tank Engine and Friends
- TTY – (i) TeleTYpewriter (Printer)
- TTYL – (i) Talk To You Later (Internet slang)
- TTZ – (p) Tetrazolium

== TU ==
- TU – (i) Technische Universität (German for "Technical University") – Thammasat University (Thailand) – (s) Turkey (FIPS 10-4 country code)
- TUC – (i) Trades Union Congress
- TUG – (a) TeX Users Group
- TUI – (a/i) Text-based user interface (cf. CLI), among other uses
- tuk – (s) Turkmen language (ISO 639-2 code)
- TUN – (s) Tunisia (ISO 3166 trigram)
- TUNS – (i) Technical University of Nova Scotia
- Tur – (s) Turkish language (ISO 639-2 code)
- TUR – (s) Turkey (ISO 3166 trigram)
- T.U.R.D. (acronym) Tactical Urban Response Department
- TUSK – (a) Tank Urban Survival Kit
- TUV – (s) Tuvalu (ISO 3166 trigram)

== TV ==
- Tv – (i) Time value, a designation seen on some camera dials for shutter priority mode
- TV
  - (i) Television
  - (s) Teravolt
  - (i) Transvestite
  - (s) Tuvalu (ISO 3166 and FIPS 10-4 country code digram)
- TVA – (i) Tennessee Valley Authority
- TVG
  - (p/i) Television Games (Network)
  - (i) Tick, Very Good, Often used by School Teachers when marking homework etc. (Tick VG)
- TVR – (i) TreVor (Wilkinson) Racing
- TVS – (i) Tornado vortex signature

== TW ==
- TWA - Trans World Airlines
- tw – (s) Twi language (ISO 639-1 code)
- TW – (s) Republic of China (Taiwan) (ISO 3166 and FIPS 10-4 country code digram) – terawatt
- TWAIN – (a) Technology Without An Interesting Name
- TWD – (s) Taiwan dollar (ISO 4217 currency code)
- TWE – (a) Trans World Entertainment
- twi – (s) Twi language (ISO 639-2 code)
- TWI – (i) The Welding Institute
- TWN – (s) Republic of China (Taiwan) (ISO 3166 trigram)
- TWP – (i) Technical Working Paper
- Twp - township
- TWS – (i) Thermal Weapon Sight – Track While Scan
- TWT - traveling wave tube
- TWX - telex
- TWIP – (a) Take What Insurance Pays – When a surgeon agrees to accept a lower payment than he ordinarily would for a procedure and not charge the patient the difference

== TX ==
- TX – (s) Texas (postal symbol) – Transmit – Turkmenistan (FIPS 10-4 country code)
- TXV – Thermostatic Expansion Valve

== TY ==
- ty
  - (s) Tahitian language (ISO 639-1 code)
  - (i) Thank you (Internet chat abbreviation)
- TYT – wikt:take your time (Internet chat abbreviation)

== TZ ==
- TZ – (s) Tanzania (ISO 3166 and FIPS 10-4 country code digram)
- TZA – (s) Tanzania (ISO 3166 trigram)
- TZC – (p) Tetrazolium chloride
- TZS – (s) Tanzanian shilling (ISO 4217 currency code)
