= Talk To You Later =

"Talk To You Later" is a phrase that is often used as a substitute for "goodbye".

Talk To You Later may also refer to:

- "Talk To Ya Later", a song by The Tubes on their album The Completion Backward Principle
- TTYL, an internet slang acronym of the phrase
- ttyl, a 2004 novel by Lauren Myracle

== See also ==
- See you later (disambiguation)
