= TAHS =

Tahs or TAHS may refer to:

- Thomas Alleyne's High School, Uttoxeter, Staffordshire, England
- Turner Ashby High School, Bridgewater, Virginia, United States
- New South Wales Waratahs, an Australian rugby union football team

== See also ==
- Tah (disambiguation)
