= TGT =

TGT may stand for:

== Chemistry ==
- Tagetitoxin
- TRNA-guanine15 transglycosylase, an enzyme
- Cysteine, an amino acid coded TGT

== Arts and media ==
- TGT (group), R&B supergroup formed by Tyrese, Ginuwine, and Tank
- Thailand's Got Talent, Thai reality television series
- The Grand Tour, British motoring programme

== Businesses ==
- TGT Oil and Gas Services
- Target Corporation, NYSE stock ticker
- Tennessee Gas Transmission Company

== Other uses ==
- Tamangic languages (Tamang, Gurung, Thakali and others)
- Tanga Airport, by IATA code, in Tanga, Tanzania
- Target (disambiguation)
- Ticket Granting Ticket, in network security
- Transitional Government of Tigray, in Ethiopia
- Trained Graduate Teacher, a teacher who holds a degree for teaching students
