= TZ-1 =

TZ-1, TZ1, or variant, may refer to:

- Phoenix Industries TZ-1 ParaFlyer, a powered parachute
- Alfa Romeo TZ1, a sportscar
- Tianzhou 1, a Chinese spaceflight mission involving the first flight of a Tianzhou space capsule
- UTC+01:00 time zone
- UTC−01:00 time zone

== See also ==
- TZ (disambiguation)
