= Tel =

TEL or Tel may refer to:

== Businesses and organisations ==
- PLDT Inc., Filipino telecommunications company with the Philippine Stock Exchange symbol TEL
- Tokyo Electron, a semiconductor equipment manufacturer
- TE Connectivity, a technology company, NYSE stock symbol TEL
- The European Library, an Internet service

== Place names ==
- Tel, Azerbaijan
- Tel River, in Orissa, India

== Science and technology ==
- Technology-Enhanced Learning
- Tetraethyllead, an organolead compound formerly used to make leaded gasoline
- ETV6, previously known as TEL, a gene
- Transporter erector launcher, a mobile missile launch platform
- Tolman electronic parameter, a property of ligands
- tel, a URI scheme for telephone numbers
- .tel, an internet top-level domain
- tel, a parameter in the hCard microformat

== Sports ==
- Mathys Tel, French footballer of Guadeloupean descent

== Other uses ==
- Tell (archaeology), or tel, a type of archaeological mound created by human occupation
- Test of Economic Literacy, a standardized test of economics
- Thomson–East Coast Line, a mass rapid transit line in Singapore
- Telescopium, a minor constellation in the southern celestial hemisphere
- Telugu language, ISO 639-2/3 language code tel

== See also ==
- Tell (disambiguation)
- El Tel, nickname for Terry Venables, English football manager
