= TCG =

TCG may refer to:

== Businesses and organisations ==
- Taipei City Government, Taiwan
- TCG (company), U.S. investment advisory firm
- TCGPlayer, an online trading card service
- Teleport Communications Group, defunct U.S. telephone company
- Theatre Communications Group, New York non-profit
- Thomas Cook Group, defunct travel agency and airline
- Tongan Crip Gang, street gang in North America and Australasia
- Trusted Computing Group, commercial consortium on technological protection measures
- Tunisian Combat Group, Islamist insurgents' network

== Other uses ==
- Geocentric Coordinate Time (French: Temps-coordonnée géocentrique)
- Test call generator, in telecommunications
- TCG (album), 2007 album from The Cheetah Girls
- Trading card game, collectible form of game
- Türkiye Cumhuriyeti Gemisi, ship prefix for Ship of the Turkish Republic
- The genetic code for the amino acid Serine, according to the DNA codon table
- IATA code for Tacheng Airport, China
- Tiny Code Generator, interpreter/translator engine of QEMU
