= TBH =

TBH may refer to:

- Talento Bilingüe de Houston ("Bilingual Theater of Houston")
- Tharawal language, ISO 639-3 language code
- "To Be Honest", see List of acronyms and initialisms: T
- .TBH files
- tbh (app), an anonymous social media app

== Transport ==
- Tugdan Airport, IATA airport code
- Trinity Air Bahamas, ICAO airport code
- Tatibahar railway station, Lakhimpur district, Assam, India
