= TND =

TND may refer to:

== Arts and entertainment ==
- TND (TV station), Australia
- The National Desk, an American television news program
- Tomorrow Never Dies (video game), 1999

== Other uses ==
- TND (hate symbol)
- Traditional Neighborhood Development, associated with New Urbanism
- Tunisian dinar (ISO 4217: TND)
- Alberto Delgado Airport, Cuba (IATA: TND)
- Angosturas Tunebo, spoken in Colombia (ISO 639: tnd)

== See also ==
- Tomorrow Never Dies (disambiguation)
