= Ters =

Ters may refer to:

- Ters (river), a river in the Kyrgyz Republic
- Ters (mountain), a mountain in the Kyrgyz Republic
- Ters (village), a village in Aksy District, Kyrgyz Republic
- St Ters of Antwerp, a phallic saint

== See also ==
- TERS (disambiguation)
