= Tess =

Tess or TESS may refer to:

== Film and television ==
- Tess (1979 film), a 1979 film adaptation of Tess of the d'Urbervilles
- Tess (2016 film), a South African production
- "Tess" (Cold Squad), a 1998 television episode

== Music ==
- Tess (band), a Spanish pop band active from 2000 to 2005
- Tess (musician), a UK musician
- Tess Mattisson, a Swedish musician born 1978

== Science and technology ==
- Trademark Electronic Search System, a service of the United States Patent and Trademark Office
- Transiting Exoplanet Survey Satellite, a space telescope designed to search for extra-solar planets
- Ethinylestradiol/cyproterone acetate, a birth control pill
- Telescopic Sighting System, a tank/fighter aircraft sight

== Other uses ==
- Tess (given name)
- Various storms named Tess
- Nikolay Tess (1921–2006), member of the Soviet Ministry for State Security, convicted in Latvia of mass deportations of Latvians in the 1940s

== See also ==
- TES (disambiguation)
