= TE =

Te or TE may refer to:

== Businesses ==
- TE Connectivity, a connectivity and sensor component company
- Air New Zealand (former IATA airline code TE, from 1965 to 1990)
- FlyLal (IATA airline code TE)
- Tasman Empire Airways Limited (former IATA airline code TE, from 1939 to 1965)
- Telecom Egypt, an Egyptian telephone company
- Telecom Éireann, defunct Irish national telephone company
- TotalEnergies, a French energy and petroleum company

== Language ==
- Te (cuneiform), a cuneiform sign
- Te (Cyrillic) (Т, т), a letter in the Cyrillic alphabet
- Te (kana) (て, テ), a Japanese kana
- Telugu language (ISO 639-1 code "te")

== People ==
- Aregado Mantenque Té (born c. 1963), Guinea-Bissau politician and leader of the Workers' Party
- Emiliano Té (born 1983), Bissau-Guinean footballer
- Ricardo Vaz Tê (born 1986), Portuguese footballer
- Tussenvoegsel prefix in Dutch surnames

== Science and technology ==
=== Biology and medicine ===
- TE buffer, a commonly used buffer solution in molecular biology
- Ilex cookii, a plant commonly called "Te"
- Terminologia Embryologica, an international standard for human embryology nomenclature
- Thalidomide embryopathy, a congenital deformation related to the use of the drug thalidomide
- Thioescaline, a psychoactive drug
- Transformation efficiency, the efficiency by which cells can take up extracellular DNA and express genes encoded by it
- Transposable element, a sequence of DNA that can move about in the genome, including transposons
- Echo time in magnetic resonance imaging

=== Other uses in science and technology ===
- TE cooler, a solid-state electronic cooler
- TE mode, a type of transverse mode of electromagnetic radiation
- Tellurium, symbol Te, a chemical element
- Test engineer, a professional that designs testing processes
- Type enforcement, an IT security concept

== Sport ==
- Te (martial arts), the Okinawan martial arts
- Tight end, a position in American football

== Other uses ==
- "te", a name for the lowered seventh pitch of the musical scale in solfège
- Duat or Te, the afterlife in Ancient Egyptian religion
- De (Chinese), also transliterated as Te, a concept in Chinese philosophy
- Province of Teramo, Italy, vehicle registration
- TE, vehicle registration plates for Tetovo, a city in the Republic of Macedonia
- Palazzo del Te, a palace in Mantua, Italy
- "Te", a song by Macintosh Plus from Floral Shoppe

== See also ==
- Teh (disambiguation)
