= THSU =

THSU or Thsu may refer to:

- Texas Health and Science University - Traditional Chinese Medicine school in Austin, TX
- Tower Hamlets Summer University - Charity organization that now goes by the name: Futureversity
