= TES =

Tes or TES may refer to:

== Places ==
- Tés, a village in Hungary
- Tes River, a river in Mongolia
- Tes (Yenisey left trubutary), a river in Russia
- Tes, Uvs, a district in Mongolia's Uvs Province
- Tes, Zavkhan, a district in Mongolia's Zavkhan Province
- Teş, a village in Brestovăț Commune, Timiș County, Romania
- Tes, Minusinsky District, village in Russia
- Tes, Novosyolovsky District, settlement in Russia

== Arts and entertainment ==
- Teatrul Evreiesc de Stat, the State Jewish Theater in Romania
- The Early Show, a morning television program on CBS in the United States
- The Elder Scrolls, a video game series by Bethesda Softworks
- The Eminem Show, a 2002 album by hip-hop artist Eminem
- Tes (rapper), American rapper from Brooklyn, New York, US

== Science and technology ==
- Thermal energy storage, a group of technologies which are used to store and release thermal energy
- Transition edge sensor, a type of superconducting detector used in physics and astronomy
- Bellanca TES, an experimental aircraft constructed by Giuseppe Mario Bellanca in 1929

=== Biology and chemistry ===
- TES (buffer), a common buffer solution in biology
- TES (protein), or "testin", the protein product of the TESS gene in Homo sapiens
- Triethylsilane, a trialkylsilicon hydride compound
- Twin embolisation syndrome, in which a fetus dies in utero and is reabsorbed by its twin

=== Spaceflight ===
- Technology Experiment Satellite, a satellite launched in 2001 by the Indian Space Research Organization
- Thermal Emission Spectrometer, a scientific instrument aboard Mars Global Surveyor
- Tropospheric Emission Spectrometer, a satellite instrument designed by the NASA Jet Propulsion Laboratory

== Military ==
- Tactical engagement simulation, a training system of the U.S. Army
- Theater Event System, a United States missile defense program

== Publications ==
- Tes (magazine), formerly the Times Educational Supplement
- Tatar Encyclopaedia, a 2002 Tatar-language book on the history of the Tatar people
- Talmud Eser Sefirot, a Kabbalistic book written by Rabbi Yehuda Ashlag

== Schools ==
- Taipei European School, an international school in Taipei, Taiwan
- The English School (Colegio de Inglaterra), an international school in Bogotá, Colombia

== Other uses ==
- The Eulenspiegel Society, a U.S. non-profit BDSM organization
- Technical Element Score, a part of the ISU Judging System for scoring figure skating competition
- Transcranial electrical stimulation (tES), a group of brain stimulation techniques including transcranial random noise stimulation
- Texas EquuSearch, an organization that searches for missing persons

== See also ==
- Te (disambiguation)
- Tess (disambiguation)
- Test (disambiguation)
