= TSEC =

TSEC may refer to:

- Taiwan Stock Exchange Corporation
- The former name of the techno band Lagoona
- Thadomal Shahani Engineering College, Mumbai
- The Solid Energy Crew
- Telecommunications Security
- TATA Social Enterprise Challenge
- Tissue-selective estrogen complex

== See also ==
- TESC (disambiguation)
