= TRA =

Tra or TRA may refer to:

== Biology ==
- TRA (gene), in humans encodes the protein T-cell receptor alpha locus
- Tra (gene), in Drosophila melanogaster encodes the protein female-specific protein transformer
- Tra gene, a transfer gene
- Triple releasing agent or serotonin-norepinephrine-dopamine releasing agent

== People ==
- Trà Hòa bố để, King of Champa (in what is now southern Vietnam) 1342−1360
- Phạm Văn Trà (born 1935), Vietnamese general
- Trần Văn Trà (1918–1996), North Vietnamese general
- William Tra Thomas (born 1974), former US footballer

== Other ==
- tRA (baseball statistic)
- Taiwan Relations Act of the US, 1979
- Tarama Airport, Okinawa Prefecture, Japan (IATA code: TRA)
- Tax Receivable Agreements, a type of legal contract
- Theory of reasoned action, a model of persuasion
- Threat and risk assessment
- Tirahi language of Afghanistan, ISO 639-3 code
- Constellation Triangulum Australe
- Transport Research Arena, European conference
- Trans rights activist, in the transgender rights movement
- "Tra", a song by Bad Gyal from her 2018 album Worldwide Angel
- "Tra", a song by Soto Asa featuring Bad Gyal
- Technology readiness assessment
- Teaching Regulation Agency, the regulator for teachers and trainee teachers in England
- Taiwan Railways Administration, the former railway operator of Taiwan (now Taiwan Railway)
