= TGT Oil and Gas Services =

TGT Diagnostics
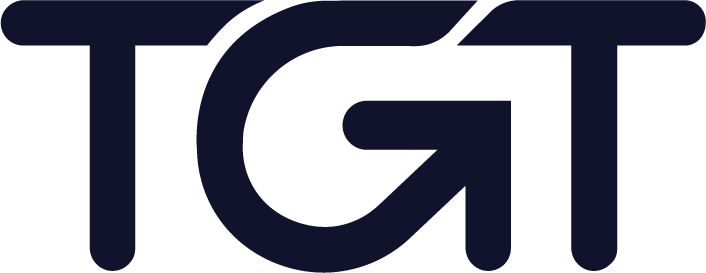
- Formerly: TGT Oil and Gas Services
- Type: Privately held company
- Industry: Oil and gas, Upstream (petroleum industry)
- Founded: 1998
- Founder: Arthur Aslanyan; Georgy Vasilyev
- Headquarters: KEZAD, Abu Dhabi, UAE
- Area served: Worldwide
- Key people: Julian Martin-Gaubeca (Chief Executive Officer)
- Services: Well logging
- Number of employees: 300 +
- Website: tgtdiagnostics.com

TGT Diagnostics is a downhole logging and diagnostics company for energy production and storage. The company is headquartered in Abu Dhabi, UAE with a worldwide presence and operation in all the continents. With offices in the United States, United Kingdom, Norway, Saudi Arabia, UAE, Oman, Malaysia and Australia, TGT has served its clients in North and South America, across Europe, North and Sub-Saharan Africa, all of Middle East, Central, South and Southeast Asia and Australia.

The company creates products and technology that diagnose Reservoir Performance and Well Integrity throughout the well system, from the wellbore to the reservoir.

== Company history ==
TGT Diagnostics was founded in 1998 by Arthur M. Aslanyan and Georgy V. Vasilyev, former students of Nikolay N. Neprimerov, Professor of Physics at Kazan State University, who created his school of oil reservoir studies and engineering in the 1950s.

In 1999, the company diagnosed its first well in an oilfield in the Republic of Tatarstan.

In 2001, TGT Diagnostics expanded its operations worldwide and established the headquarters in the United Arab Emirates.

In 2003 – first international contract, providing well diagnostics to an operator producing from the Lekhwair oil field, Oman's largest oil and gas producer.

In 2006, TGT develops an acoustic technique to determine fluid or Gas flow through the reservoir or through leaks from downhole well components.

In 2011, TGT Diagnostics underwent a financial and technical audit and joined the investment portfolio of Lime Rock Partners.

In 2011, TGT Diagnostics initiated a proposal to the TatNeft petroleum company to form a joint venture for oil redevelopment and generated a redevelopment project for the Bavly oilfield of Tatarstan. The company proposed pilot tests to be conducted using innovative oil recovery technologies in one of the oil areas operated by TatNeft.

In 2013, TGT became an active member of the Smart city project and produced a plan to build an R&D Centre on an investment site in the project area. In 2013–2015, a research center and a production park were to be built on an area of 5 ha to accommodate modern research laboratories, a hotel and production and storage facilities. The company also planned to participate in the creation of an educational cluster allowing students, graduates and young specialists to have practical training and study. In 2015, all the plans were implemented at another location in the same city, where the company built its Technology Centre to accommodate 350 workplaces, with 100 of them in the company's manufacturing unit. The opening took place on 10 June 2015.

In 2014, the company presented its key technologies at the Open Innovations international forum.

In 2021, TGT Diagnostics wins Gold at the Transform Awards MEA 2021 by Transform magazine.

In 2022, TGT creates flow diagnostics for horizontal wells.

The company regularly participates in SPE's, ADIPEC, and other conferences, symposia and exhibitions, exhibiting and sponsoring international events.

== Services and activities ==
The company's key technologies have been developed in-house and patented worldwide, and its research and development activities are carried out as resident projects at the Skolkovo Innovation Centre in Moscow and at the IT Park in Kazan.

TGT Diagnostics specializes in integrated well logging and provides the following:

- Well integrity assessment for vertical and horizontal wells including those with two tubing strings
- Behind-casing flow pattern analysis for injection and production wells
- Formation pressure determination
- Micro-grid hydrodynamic modelling using well log data for sidetracking, new drilling and production rate forecasting

TGT Diagnostics has developed the following technologies:

- Spectral noise logging (SNL)
- High Precision Temperature (HPT) logging
- Termosim thermo-hydrodynamic simulator, a software system that quantifies injection and production profiles at any time and point in a well and surrounding rocks under various well operating conditions
- Pulse, magnetic imaging defectoscopy (former MID and EmPulse)
- Integrated PLT technique
- Memory pulsed neutron-neutron (PNN) logging
- LogViz software for well log data visualisation and analysis
