= TGA =

TGA or tga may refer to:

- Tonga, an IOC code
- Sagalla language, an ISO 639-3 code
- Tengah Air Base, an IATA Airport Code
- Tandy Graphics Adapter for the Tandy 1000 computer system
- Tasman Global Access, a submarine cable linking Australia and New Zealand
- Tennessee Governor's Academy for Math and Science, United States
- Therapeutic Goods Administration, Australian regulatory body
- Thermogravimetric analysis, materials testing procedure
- Thioglycolic acid, organic compound
- Tooronga railway station, Melbourne
- Transient global amnesia, a medical condition
- Transposition of the great arteries, a congenital heart defect
- Treasury General Account, a bank account held by the U.S. government
- Truevision TGA or TARGA, graphics file format
- TGA, one of three stop codons
- The Gainsborough Academy, an academy in Gainsborough, Lincolnshire, England
- The Game Awards, an annual video game awards ceremony
