= TGB =

TGB or tgb can stand for:

- Taiwan Golden Bee, manufacturer of scooters and quad bikes
- Taseko Mines Ltd, NYSE MKT symbol
- Temagami Greenstone Belt, a geologic formation in Temagami, Ontario, Canada
- The Good Burger, restaurant chain in Spain
- Tiagabine, an anticonvulsant medication
- Tobilung, a dialect of Momogun language, ISO 639-3 code tgb
- Très grande bibliothèque, nickname of the Bibliothèque nationale de France
- Turkey Youth Union
