= Workers' Party (Guinea-Bissau) =

Political party in Guinea-Bissau

- Founded: 17 July 2002
- Ideology: Labourism; Marxism-Leninism; Socialism
- Political position: Left-wing

Party flag

The Workers' Party (Portuguese: Partido dos Trabalhadores, PT) is a socialist political party in Guinea-Bissau.

== History ==
The party was established by Aregado Mantenque Té in Lisbon, Portugal, on 17 July 2002. It did not field candidates in the 2004 parliamentary elections, but Té returned to the country to contest the 2005 presidential elections. He received 2% of the vote, finishing fifth in a field of thirteen candidates.

The 2008 parliamentary elections saw another fifth-place finish for the party, but it failed to win a seat in the National People's Assembly. Té ran in the 2009 presidential elections, but received only 0.5% of the vote, finishing seventh out of the eleven candidates. Té was prevented from standing in the 2012 presidential elections after the Supreme Court ruled that his candidacy failed to meet the requirements of the electoral law.

However, Té was successful in registering for the 2014 general elections. In the presidential elections he received 1% of the vote, whilst the parliamentary elections saw the party win 0.6% of the vote, again failing to win a seat.
