= TID =

TID or tid may refer to:

- Thermionic detector, a detector used in gas chromatography based on the principle of ionization and measuring a change in electron flux
- Total ionizing dose (related to ionizing radiation)
- Transient ischemic dilation, a finding on a nuclear cardiology test consistent with coronary artery disease
- TID class tug, a British tugboat design of World War II
- TID (musician) – a musician from Tanzania
- Traffic identifier – an identifier used for traffic flows in 802.11 wireless local-area networks
- ter in die, Latin for three times daily; usually refers to prescription medication dosage (e.g. TID)
- Tag identification memory, in a Gen 2 RFID tag, this consists of memory about the tag itself, such as the tag ID
- Transportation improvement district
- Travelling Ionospheric Disturbance – a type of Ionospheric perturbation
- Truncated dodecahedron
- Travel itinerary directory
- Tobacco Induced Diseases – a peer reviewed journal
- Thread identifier
- Technical Investigation Department, a special operations department in the Los Angeles Police Department.
