= TBM =

TBM may refer to:

- Socata TBM, a family of single engine turboprop aircraft
- Tactical ballistic missile
- Tambaram railway station, Chennai, Tamil Nadu, India (Southern Railway station code)
- Theatre ballistic missile
- TBM Avenger, a version of the Grumman TBF Avenger torpedo bomber built under contract by Eastern Aircraft
- Tracheobronchomalacia, a condition affecting the trachea
- Transferable belief model, a mathematical theory on uncertainty
- Tunnel boring machine, used to excavate tunnels with a circular cross section
- Transports Bordeaux Métropole, a French public transport system
- Trailing bit manipulation, a type of bit manipulation instruction set
- Tuberculomucin Weleminsky, a treatment for tuberculosis
- tert-Butylthiol, also known as tert-butyl mercaptan
- Tritium breeding module of a fusion power reactor

Music and entertainment:

- The Birthday Massacre, a Canadian synth-rock band
- The Beautiful Music, a Canadian indie record label
- Three Blind Mice, a Japanese record label
- Techno Body Music, genre similar to Electronic body music but inspired by techno and trance
