= TPE =

TPE may refer to:

== Places ==
- Taipei (ISO 3166 code: TW-TPE), the capital of Taiwan
- "Chinese Taipei" (IOC and FIFA code: TPE), the name used in some international organizations and competitions for Taiwan

== Science and technology ==
- TPE (cable system), a submarine telecommunications cable
- Thermoplastic elastomer, a class of copolymers with both thermoplastic and elastomeric properties
- Transponder equivalent, a method of comparing communication satellite bandwidths
- Triphenylethylene, the parent compound of a group of selective estrogen receptor modulators
- Tree-structured Parzen Estimator, a sequential model-based optimization (SMBO) algorithm

== Transport ==
- Tampines East MRT station (MRT station abbreviation: TPE), a Mass Rapid Transit station in Tampines, Singapore
- Taoyuan International Airport (IATA code: TPE), an airport serving Taipei and northern Taiwan
- TransPennine Express (disambiguation), former and current train operating companies in the UK
- TransPennine Express, current UK train operating company
- TransPennine Express (2016–2023), former UK train operating company
- Tampines Expressway, Singapore

== Other uses ==
- That Petrol Emotion, a Northern Irish/Anglo/American band
- Total Power Exchange, a BDSM dynamic
