= TFR =

TFR may refer to:

== Military ==
- Task Force Ranger, the U.S. military task force deployed to Somalia in 1993 during Operation Gothic Serpent
- Operation TFR, the U.S. military operation that became the 1993 Battle of Mogadishu

== Science and engineering ==
- Total fertility rate
- Transferrin receptor (TfR)
- Time–frequency representation of a signal
- Tokamak de Fontenay aux Roses, 1970s tokamak in France

== Transportation ==
- Isuzu Faster, truck named Isuzu TFR in Thailand
- Temporary flight restriction, a geographic restriction instituted by the Federal Aviation Administration
- Terrain-following radar, for military aircraft
- Transnet Freight Rail, a South African rail transport company

== Other ==
- Texans for Fiscal Responsibility, a U.S. nonprofit for political advocacy of lower spending and lower taxes
- Thrift Financial Report, a required report from financial institutions in the U.S.
- Teribe language (ISO 639 code tfr)
- The Final Reckoning, the eighth film in the Mission: Impossible franchise
