= TC =

TC, T.C., Tc, T_{c}, tc, tC, or .tc may refer to:

== Arts and entertainment ==
=== Film and television ===
- Theodore "T.C." Calvin, a character on the TV series Magnum, P.I. and its reboot
- Top Cat, an animated sitcom named after the protagonist

=== Music ===
- TC Smith, American singer, for TCR
- Tom Constanten (born 1944), American musician from the Grateful Dead
- Top Combine, a Mandopop boy band
- TC (musician), a British drum and bass producer and DJ

=== Games ===
- Transcendental Chess
- X3: Terran Conflict, a PC game
- T.C., an era designation in the Xenosaga game series

== Media ==
- TC Televisión, an Ecuadorian television network
- Teleclub, a Swiss pay television operator
- Telecanal, a defunct Chilean television channel

== Organizations ==
- TC Electronic, a Danish manufacturer of studio equipment and guitar effects
- Air Tanzania (IATA code TC)
- Teachers College, Columbia University, a graduate school of education in New York City
- Telecom Cambodia, a telecom company in Cambodia
- Tierra Comunera, a Spanish political party
- Thompson Creek Metals Company Inc (NYSE: TC), a diversified mining company
- Transport Canada, a Canadian federal government department
- Trinity College (Connecticut), an American liberal arts college
- Tomball College, now Lone Star College-Tomball
- Transport Canberra, Australian transport agency
- TechCrunch, a tech news website

== People ==
- TC Clements, Michigan state representative
- Tony Currie (footballer) (born 1950), English footballer
- Tom Caron, American television host for New England Sports Network

== Places ==
- The Republic of Turkey, from the Turkish name, Türkiye Cumhuriyeti
- Traverse City, Michigan, US
- Turks and Caicos Islands (ISO 3166-1 country code TC)

== Science and technology ==
=== Biology and medicine ===
- Testicular cancer
- Therapeutic community, a treatment program for addictions, personality disorder or other mental problems
- Cytotoxic T-cells

=== Chemistry and physics ===
- Technetium, symbol Tc, a chemical element
- Temperature coefficient
- Critical temperature (T_{c})
- Convective temperature (T_{c})
- Curie temperature (T_{c})
- Teracoulomb, an SI unit for electric charge equal to 10^{12} coulombs
- Tonnes of Carbon (tC)

=== Computing ===
- Turing complete
- .tc, the Internet country code top-level domain (ccTLD) for Turks and Caicos Islands
- TC (complexity), a complexity class
- tc (Linux), a command-line utility used to configure network traffic control in the Linux kernel
- Take Command (command line interpreter), a command line interpreter by JP Software
- Telecine (copying), a form of digital transfer using a Telecine machine
- Teleconference
- TrueCrypt, a disk encryption software
- Trusted Computing, a scheme for adding additional controls on what computers may or may not do into hardware or software

=== Transportation ===
- TC, a Mazda piston engine
- Chrysler TC by Maserati, an automobile sold by Chrysler from 1989 to 1991
- Scion tC, a touring coupe produced by Scion based on the Toyota Avensis
- Traction control system, an anti-slip automobile subsystem
- Turn coordinator, an aircraft instrument
- Transit center, a major transport hub for trains and buses
- Turkey (aircraft registration prefix TC)

=== Other uses in science and technology ===
- Technical committee, see
- Technological change
- Teleconverter, a kind of secondary photographic lens
- Timecode, in video and audio production
- Tropical cyclone, also known as a hurricane, tropical storm, tropical depression, or typhoon
- Turbocharger, turbine-driven device that increases an internal combustion engine's power output

== Sports ==
- T.C. Bear, mascot for the Minnesota Twins baseball team
- TC 2000, a series of races for touring cars which is held each year in Argentina
- TC Panther, the mascot of the Northern Iowa Panthers
- Tahiti Cup, national association football cup competition in Tahiti
- Tonga Cup, national association football cup competition in Tonga
- Total chances, a baseball fielding term
- Turismo Carretera, a popular stock car category in Argentina

== Other uses ==
- Total Communication, a form of sign language
- Total cost, in economics and accounting
- Traffic collision, an automobile accident
- Trinity Cross, the highest national award in Trinidad and Tobago
- Type certificate, an aircraft document
- Traditional Chinese characters, Chinese characters in any character set that does not contain newly created characters or character substitutions performed after 1946
- United States Tax Court, a U.S. Article I federal trial court
