= TBT =

TBT may refer to:

== Arts ==
- Texas Ballet Theater

== Economics ==
- Technical barriers to trade, a class of non-tariff barriers to trade

== Education ==
- Tampa Bay Technical High School in Tampa, Florida

== Media ==
- tbt*, a free daily tabloid newspaper published by the Tampa Bay Times
- Throwback Thursday or #TBT, a trend among users of social media sites to post or repost older photographs

== Music ==
- Taken by Trees, a Swedish indie pop project from Victoria Bergsman
- Trampled by Turtles, an American bluegrass band
- Twisted Brown Trucker, the band of American singer-songwriter, musician, and rapper Kid Rock
- The Bandito Tour, a world tour by the musical duo Twenty One Pilots

== Science ==
- Tributyltin, a chemical compound

== Sports ==
- The Basketball Tournament, a single-elimination basketball tournament in the United States

== Other uses ==
- Turn-based tactics, video game genre
- Alvis Unipower Tank Bridge Transporter, an engineering vehicle in the British Army
- Tabatinga International Airport IATA code
