= TCW =

TCW may refer to:

- "My T.C.W.", a season two episode of the TV series Scrubs
- Tactical Communications Wing, one of two wings of No. 90 Signals Unit RAF
- TCW Group, an asset management firm based in Los Angeles, California
- Star Wars: The Clone Wars (2008-2020), an animated television series part of the larger Star Wars franchise
- Thomas Calhoun Walker, lawyer and education advocate who lived at the T. C. Walker House
- Thomas Chatterton Williams, an American author
- Thomas Cook Airlines Belgium (ICAO code: TCW), a Belgian leisure airline owned by the Thomas Cook Group
- Traverse City West Senior High School, a secondary school in Michigan.
- Trican Well Service (TSX ticker: TCW), a provider of oilfield services
- Tung Chung West station, Hong Kong (MTR station code: TCW)
- Tocumwal Airport, IATA airport code "TCW"
- Total Carat Weight
