= The Good Burger =

Restaurant chain in Spain

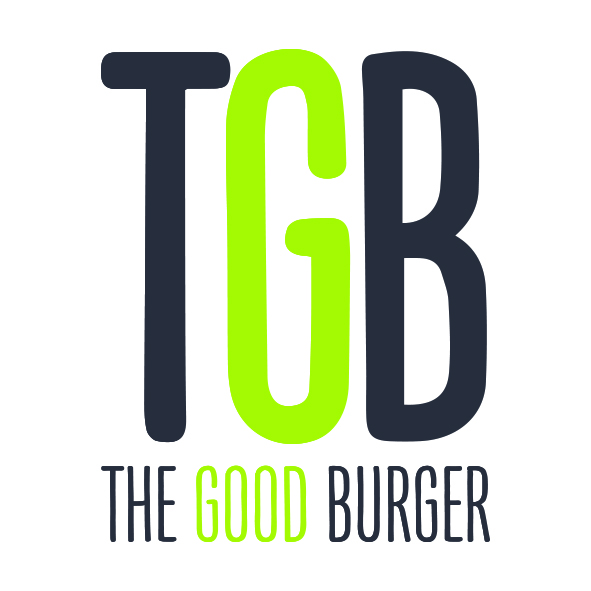
- Industry: Restaurant chain
- Founded: 2013
- Area served: Spain, Portugal
- Owner: Restalia Group
- Website: thegoodburger.com/en

The Good Burger (TGB) is a restaurant chain, founded in 2013, belonging to the Spanish multibrand group Restalia, owner of Cervecería 100 Montaditos and Cervecería La Sureña.

== Concept ==
TGB is an urban-themed, New York City-inspired fast food chain. The TGB menu is made up of hamburgers, appetizers, and other products such as hot dogs and salads. The interior design of the premises is based on both lighting and materials on the urban industrial theme. The kitchen area of all restaurants is open, as is common in these types of fast food restaurants.

== History ==
TGB, Restalia's third concept after "100 Montaditos" and "Cervecería La Sureña", opened its first restaurant in November 2013 in Madrid (in La Vaguada shopping center). It has more than 100 restaurants open in Spain, as of 2016.

== Awards and recognitions ==
- Spanish Association of Shopping Centers (AECC): Award for "Best Chain/Franchise" (2014).
- Comercio del año: Best Business of the Year award in the Burger category (2020)
