= Test call generator =

Test call generators (TCGs) are revenue assurance software that replicates events on a telecoms network to identify potential revenue leakage and to help achieve regulatory compliance.
