= TJD =

TJD may refer to:

- Temporomandibular joint dysfunction
- Julian day
- Trayce Jackson-Davis, American basketball player
