= TMR =

TMR may refer to:

== Arts and media ==
- Trout Mask Replica, an experimental rock album by Captain Beefheart & His Magic Band
- The Morning Rush, a morning radio show by Monster RX 93.1, Philippines
- TMR, catalog numbers of Third Man Records

== Organisations ==
- Tokio Millennium Re Ltd., is a reinsurance company headquartered in Bermuda
- Transports de Martigny et Régions, a Swiss railway company
- Department of Transport and Main Roads, Queensland, Australia

== Places ==
- Aguenar – Hadj Bey Akhamok Airport (IATA airport identifier), Algeria
- Town of Mount Royal, Quebec, Canada
- Transnistrian Moldovan Republic or Transnistria

== Science and technology ==
- Rolls-Royce Thrust Measuring Rig, an experimental VTOL aircraft
- Tetramethylrhodamine, a derivative of rhodamine
- Transmyocardial revascularization, heart disease treatment
- Triple modular redundancy, a computing voting system
- Tunnel magnetoresistance, a magnetoresistive effect

== People ==
- Matthew Berry (born 1969/1970), fantasy football player
- The Mexican Runner (Piotr Delgado Kusielczuk), speedrunner, video game player
- TM Revolution (Takanori Nishikawa, born 1970), Japanese musician

== Other uses ==
- Jewish Babylonian Aramaic (ISO 639-3 language code)
- Total mixed ration, a method of feeding cattle
- Times New Roman, a common typeface
