= Aregado Mantenque Té =

Bissau-Guinean politician

Aregado Mantenque Té (1963 – 1 August 2015) was a Bissau-Guinean politician who was the leader of the Workers' Party.

Born in Caio, he attended high school in Bissau while working as a shoe-shine boy. He soon became interested in politics and before finishing school he had to leave Bissau for Gambia and then Senegal. In this time he worked mainly in docks in Gambia and Dakar and became an activist for FLING the democratic opposition to Luis Cabral. Eventually he was able to move to Portugal where he completed his education becoming a doctor of law at the Universidade Moderna in Lisbon in 2002.

Té founded the Workers' Party of Guinea Bissau (Partido dos Trabalhadores) in Lisbon, Portugal, on 17 July 2002. After a stay in England he returned to Guinea Bissau to legally register his party at campaign in the 2005 presidential elections where he gained 9,000 votes – less than the number of registered party members. Té also contested the legislative elections in 2006 and the presidential elections of 2009 (where his party finished with 0.5% of the vote) and of 2012, unsuccessfully.

He died from complications due to diabetes in Ziguinchor on 1 August 2015.
