= Teh (disambiguation) =

Teh is a common typographical error of the word the and internet slang neologism.

Teh or TEH may also refer to:

== People ==
- Huang Sian Teh (born 1919), Taiwanese martial artist
- Teh Cheang Wan (1928–1986), Singaporean architect
- Teh Hong Piow (born 1930), Chairman of Public Bank Berhad in Malaysia
- Teh Kew San (born 1934), former Malaysian badminton player

== Other uses ==
- The Indonesian, Malay, Javanese, Sunda, and Minangkabau word for tea.
- The drink Teh Tarik
- A variant of the Chinese surname Zheng (Chinese: 鄭/郑) common in Singapore and Malaysia.
- Teh, a somewhat old-fashioned spelling of the Chinese phoneme now represented by Wade–Giles te or pinyin de, most commonly De (Chinese)
- Trans Europe Halles, European network of independent cultural centres
- ISO 639-3 code for the Tehuelche language of Patagonia
- Tehran, capital of Iran
- Tellurol (TeH), analogues of alcohols (-OH) where tellurium replaces oxygen.

== See also ==
- Dzu-Teh
- Lien-teh
- Ming-teh
- Teh-hui
