= THB =

THB may refer to:

- Tanah Abang railway station, Jakarta, Indonesia
- Tetrahydrobiopterin, a drug
- Tetrahydrocorticosterone, a hormone
- Thai baht, the currency of Thailand (ISO 4217 code: THB)
- THB (comics), and the character Tri-Hydro Bi-Oxygenate
- Three Horses Beer of Madagascar
- Toronto, Hamilton and Buffalo Railway reporting mark
- Transport and Housing Bureau of the Hong Kong government (2007–2022)
- IATA code of Thaba Tseka Airport, an airport serving Thaba-Tseka in Lesotho
- ThB, Bachelor of Theology degree
