= TM =

TM or Tm and variants may refer to:

- Trademark, often indicated with the symbol ™
  - Trademark symbol

== Businesses and organizations ==
- TM Forum, telecommunications and entertainment industry association
- TM Supermarket, a chain of supermarkets in Zimbabwe
- LAM Mozambique Airlines (IATA airline designator TM)
- Telekom Malaysia, telecommunications company
- Texas Mexican Railway (reporting mark TM)
- TM (cellular service), a telecommunications brand in the Philippines
- Toastmasters International, an international public speaking organization
- Toyota (NYSE symbol TM)
- Tokyo Metro, one of the major subway systems of Tokyo

== Science and technology ==
=== Biology and medicine ===
- Melting temperature (T_{m}) in nucleic acid thermodynamics, at which half of DNA strands are in the ssDNA state
- Transport maximum, where concentration increase does not speed membrane traversal
- Transverse myelitis, a neurological condition in which the spinal cord is inflamed
- Translational medicine
- TM domain, a membrane-spanning protein domain

=== Computing ===
- .tm, the Internet domain code for Turkmenistan
- Struct tm, calendar time type in the C and C++ programming languages
- Traceability matrix, in software development
- Translation memory
- Turing machine, a hypothetical universal computing machine

=== Physics and chemistry ===
- Tm ligands, a tridentate ligand used in coordination chemistry
- Melting point (abbreviated T_{m}), in physics and materials science
- Thulium, symbol Tm, a chemical element
- Transition metal
- Transverse magnetic modes, in optics and wave theory

=== Other uses in science and technology ===
- Thematic Mapper, an Earth-observing sensor on a Landsat satellite
- Terametre (Tm), equal to 10^{12} metres
- TM (triode) (from French Telegraphie Militaire), standard small-signal vacuum tube of the Allies of World War I

== Other uses ==
- Taskmaster (TV series), a British TV comedy show adapted in several other countries.
- Thames Measurement, a shipping tonnage measure
- Their Majesties, for multiple monarchs each styled "His/Her Majesty"
- Torpedoman's mate, a former rank of the U.S. Navy
- Transcendental Meditation, a specific form of mantra meditation
- Trans-Manhattan Expressway, a highway in New York City
- Turkmenistan (ISO country code TM)
- TrackMania, a Nadeo game
- TM (album), an album by Brockhampton
