= TFG =

TFG may refer to:

== Organizations ==
- Taipei First Girls' High School, Taiwanese all-girls senior high school
- Task Force Games, game company started in 1979
- TFG Limited, South African retail clothing group
- Transferoviar Grup, private railway company in Romania
- Transitional Federal Government of Somalia, provisional government of the Somalia from 2004–2012

== Other uses ==
- Koenigsegg TFG, an inline-3 engine
- TFG (gene), a protein that in humans is encoded by the TFG gene
- Trafalgar railway station (station code TFG), regional railway station on the Gippsland line
