= TSOP =

TSOP can stand for:

- "TSOP (The Sound of Philadelphia)", a 1974 hit single by the band MFSB
- The State of Palestine, the sovereign Palestinian state
- TSOP Records, a subsidiary of Philadelphia International Records, named after the hit MFSB song
- The Sound of Perseverance, a 1998 album by the band Death
- Thin small-outline packages, a type of surface mount electronics technology
- This Side of Paradise, the 1920 debut novel by F. Scott Fitzgerald
- TSOP.. Series (Example TSOP17), IR Receiver Modules for Remote Control Systems
