= TUC =

TUC may refer to:

== Places ==
- Teniente General Benjamín Matienzo International Airport, Tucumán, Argentina (IATA code: TUC)
- San Rafael Airport (Venezuela) (NDB code: TUC)
- Tung Chung station, Hong Kong; MTR (station code TUC)
- Tucana (constellation), standard astronomical abbreviation

== Organizations ==
- Hong Kong and Kowloon Trades Union Council
- Turismo Aéreo de Chile (ICAO airline code: TUC) airline of Chile, see List of airline codes
- Transvaal University College
- Technical University of Crete
- Trades Union Congress, a federation of trade unions in England and Wales
- Trades Union Congress of Ghana
- Trade Union Congress of Nigeria (2005)
- Aden Trade Union Congress
- Third Unitarian Church, a Unitarian Universalist church in the West Side of Chicago, Illinois

== Other uses ==
- Mutu language (ISO 639 code: tuc)
- Time of useful consciousness, duration of useful functioning in an hypoxic environment
- Star Trek VI: The Undiscovered Country, 1991 American science fiction film directed by Nicholas Meyer
- TUC (cracker), brand of salted octagonal golden-yellow crackers

== See also ==
- Tucson International Airport (code TUS, not TUC)
