= Tog =

Tog(s) or TOG(s) may refer to:

- ACM Transactions on Graphics, a scientific journal covering computer graphics
- Bruce Tognazzini's nickname
- Clothing, sometimes referred to as "togs"
  - Tog, short for "togman", a cloak or loose coat
  - Swimming togs, a swimsuit, sometimes shortened to "togs"
- An alternative name for Qaranqasho, a mid-Ramadan children’s celebration used in northern Oman
- TOG (hackerspace), a hackerspace in Dublin, Ireland
- Tog (unit) of thermal insulation
- TOG1 and TOG II*, WWII UK tank prototypes
- TOGs, "Terry's Old Geezers/Gals", listeners of a UK radio show
- TOG, the List of IOC country codes (IOC code) of Togo
- TOG superfamily of proteins.
- Tonga (Nyasa) language, ISO 639-2 code
- Turn Out Gear
- Tower of God
- Throne of Glass
