= TLD (disambiguation) =

A top-level domain (TLD) is a highest-level Internet domain name.

TLD or tld may also refer to:

- Telefónica Larga Distancia, Telefónica's Puerto Rican telecomms subsidiary
- Thermoluminescent dosimeter, measuring radioactivity
- Tuli Lodge Airport, Botswana, by IATA code
- TLD, a manufacturer of Ground support equipment.
- TLD or the Technological and Logistics Directorate (known in Hebrew as ATAL), the directorate in the IDF responsible for logistics responses and tasks
- The Living Dead horror franchise
