= TMAP =

TMAP or TMap may refer to:

- Tactile Map Automated Production, a web application for creating tactile maps for braille embossers
- Teenage Magazine Arbitration Panel
- Test Management Approach, an approach to the structured testing of software products
- Texas Medication Algorithm Project, a decision-tree medical algorithm
