= Tritium breeding module =

A tritium breeding module or TBM is a component of a fusion reactor that produces tritium.

ITER will have four easily removable TBMs in order to test various material combinations in order to develop the breeding process.

== See also ==
- Breeding blanket
