= TKM =

TKM may refer to:

- TKM (karting)
- TKM (Polish term)
- TKM Institute of Technology
- Thangal Kunju Musaliar College of Engineering
- Tshibumba Kanda-Matulu, a Congolese artist
- Toyota Kirloskar Motor, a car maker
- Tonne-kilometre, a unit of transportation measurement
- Turkmenistan, by its IOC and ISO 3166-1 alpha-3 code
