= TCU =

TCU may refer to:

== Education ==
- Taguig City University, a university in Metro Manila, Philippines
- Tanzania Commission for Universities, regulatory body for Universities in Tanzania
- Texas Christian University, a private university in Fort Worth, Texas
  - TCU Horned Frogs, the athletic programs of the school
- Tokyo Christian University, a private university in Chiba, Japan
- Tokyo City University, a private university in Tokyo, Japan
- Tzu Chi University, a private university in Hualien, Taiwan
- Tianjin Chengjian University, a university in Tianjin, China
- Tribal colleges and universities

== Science and technology ==
- Telecommunication control unit, a device that regulates input and output in a mainframe computer
- Telematic control unit, a device on board of a vehicle that controls tracking of the vehicle
- Transmission control unit, a controlling device in automobile transmissions and engines
- Thompson/Center Ugalde, a family of custom ammunition cartridges for firearms
- Towering cumulus cloud (TCu), types of which are cumulus congestus or cumulus castellanus

== Other ==
- Tauranga City United, a New Zealand association football club
- Transitional care unit, a facility in a hospital where the level of care falls between intensive care and normal care
- Transportation Communications Union, a labor group for railroad-related workers
- Triangle Credit Union, a bank in New Hampshire
- Tribunal de Contas da União, the Brazilian federal court of accounts
- Turn construction unit, a segment of speech in the study of linguistics
- The Twisted Childhood Universe, a shared universe of horror films
