= TCL =

TCL, tcl, or Tcl may refer to:

== Businesses and organizations ==
=== Businesses ===
- TCL Technology, a Chinese multinational electronics company
  - TCL Electronics, its subsidiary
- Trade Centre Limited, a former Nova Scotia Crown corporation

=== Education ===
- Theological College of Lanka, in Sri Lanka
- Trinity College London, an examination board
- People's Libraries Society (Towarzystwo Czytelni Ludowych), a former educational society in the Prussian partition of Poland
- Transnational College of Lex, a language research institution based in Japan

== Science and technology ==
=== Computing ===
- The Common Link, a Swedish bulletin board system
- Transform, clipping, and lighting, a term used in computer graphics
- Tcl (programming language) (Tool Command Language)
- Tiny Core Linux, an operating system
- Transaction Control Language, a family of computer languages used by database systems to control transactions
- Think Class Library, a class library for Macintosh featured in THINK C

=== Other uses in science and technology ===
- TCL (GTPase), a G protein
- Tibial collateral ligament, in the knee
- Thermostatically controlled load

== Transportation ==
- TCL (public transport), a public transport network in Lyon, France
- Tung Chung line, an MTR lines in Hong Kong
- Twin City Lines, a former public transit operator in Minneapolis, United States
- Tuscaloosa National Airport, United States (IATA code: TCL)

== Other uses ==
- Texas Collegiate League, an American collegiate baseball league
- Taman language (Myanmar), an ISO 639-3 code

== See also ==
- UEFA Champions League, also known as the Champions League
