= THG =

THG may refer to:

== Businesses ==
- THG plc, an e-commerce company
- THG Sports, a former sports ticketing and corporate hospitality company
- Hanover Insurance, by NYSE symbol

== Other uses ==
- Tetrahydrogestrinone, an anabolic steroid
- The Humble Guys, a 1990s IBM PC cracking group
- Third-harmonic generation, in nonlinear optics
- Thangool Airport, by IATA code
- The Hunger Games, Young-Adult book series by Suzanne Collins
