= TSL =

TSL may refer to:

== Business ==
- Trina Solar Limited, a Chinese solar power company traded on the New York Stock Exchange under the ticker "TSL"
- The Software Link, a defunct software company
- TSL Limited, a Zimbabwean company
- Transformer Specialties Ltd (TSL), a New Zealand manufacturer

== Games and sports ==
- The Spring League, a developmental American football organization
- The Silver Lining (video game), a 2010 fan-created game based on the Kings Quest series
- Star Wars: Knights of the Old Republic II The Sith Lords, a video game
- Teen Second Life, a version of Second Life reserved for teenagers
- Tasmanian State League, the premier Australian rules football competition in Tasmania, a state of Australia
- Turkish Süper Lig, the top-flight league in Turkish nationwide football
- Team Liquid Starleague professional gaming tournament for Starcraft 2 by Team Liquid

== Language ==
- Taiwanese Sign Language, used in Taiwan
- Tanzanian Sign Language, used in Tanzania
- Trisyllabic laxing, a process in English whereby long vowels become short
- Turkish Sign Language, used in Turkey

== Media ==
- The Simple Life, a TV series featuring Paris Hilton and Nicole Richie
- The Suite Life on Deck, a spinoff from The Suite Life of Zack & Cody
- The Suite Life of Zack & Cody, an American sitcom
- This Spartan Life, a machinima talk show
- This Sporting Life, an Australian radio comedy show
- The Space Lady, an American singer, musician and composer in the genres of synth pop, psychedelic pop and outsider music
- Time spent listening, one of the measurements surveyed by Arbitron in determining ratings for radio stations in the U.S.
- The Starting Line, a pop-punk band from the Philadelphia, Pennsylvania area
- The Student Life, a student newspaper publication at the Claremont Colleges in Claremont, California

== Technology ==
- Test-and-set, an atomic operation used for computer program synchronization
- Transmitter/studio link, sends telemetry data from the remotely located transmitter back to the studio for monitoring purposes

== Transport ==
- Thomson MRT line in Singapore, merged into the Thomson-East Coast Line
- Tin Shui Wai stop in Hong Kong (MTR station code)

== Other uses ==
- Time & Space Limited, an arts center in Hudson, New York
- Trinity Sergius Laura, not far from Moscow, Russia
- TSL color space based on tint, saturation, and luminance
- Top Album Sales, a Billboard chart with the shortcut "TSL"

== See also ==
- Silver Lining (disambiguation)
