= TGO =

TGO may refer to:

- IATA code for Tongliao Airport, China
- ExoMars Trace Gas Orbiter, a Mars orbiter
- Sudest language (ISO-639: tgo)
- Thailand Greenhouse Gas Management Organisation
- The Grand Opening (band), a Swedish music group
- The Great Outdoors (magazine), formerly known as TGO
- Togo, ISO-3166-1 alpha-3 code
- Tyler, the Creator (Tyler Gregory Okonma)
