= TTP =

TTP may refer to:

== Arts, entertainment, and media ==
- Tractatus Theologico-Politicus, a book by the philosopher Baruch Spinoza

== Biology ==
- Thrombotic thrombocytopenic purpura, a blood disorder
- Tristetraprolin, a protein
- Thymidine triphosphate, one of the four nucleoside triphosphates that are used in the in vivo synthesis of DNA

== Computing ==
- Terrorist Tactics, Techniques, and Procedures used by terrorists, studied by cyber security specialists
- .TTP ("TOS Takes Parameters"), a filename extension for Atari TOS
- Time-Triggered Protocol in networking
- TTP/A, in networking
- Trusted third party in cryptography
- Tesla Transport Protocol, a proprietary interconnect protocol for supercomputers that runs over PCIE or Ethernet

== Military ==
- Military doctrine, consisting of Tactics, Techniques, and Procedures

== Enterprises and organizations ==
- Tehreek-e-Tahaffuz-e-Pakistan, a Pakistani political party
- Tehreek-e-Taliban Pakistan, a jihadist militant organization
- Tree Top Piru, a gang in the United States

== Shopping centres ==
- Westfield Tea Tree Plaza

== Other uses ==
- Tagaytay 'Tol Patriots, a Filipino women's basketball team based in Tagaytay, Cavite
- Trust Territory of the Pacific Islands, UNDP country code, transferred to Palau
