= Tomorrow Never Dies (disambiguation) =

Tomorrow Never Dies is a 1997 James Bond film.

Tomorrow Never Dies may also refer to:

- Tomorrow Never Dies (video game), a 1999 game based on the film
- "Tomorrow Never Dies" (song), theme song of the film by Sheryl Crow
- Tomorrow Never Dies (soundtrack)
- Chikara Tomorrow Never Dies, a 2014 professional wrestling pay-per-view
- "Tomorrow Never Dies", a song by 5 Seconds of Summer
