= TGV (disambiguation) =

TGV is a French high-speed train.

TGV or tgv may also refer to:

- TGV (box set), a 2007 DVD set by Throbbing Gristle
- TGV Cinemas (formerly Tanjong Golden Village), a movie theater chain in Malaysia
- Tingui-Botó language (ISO 639-3: tgv), an extinct or ritual-only Karirian language, in Brazil
- Transposition of the great vessels, a group of congenital heart defects
- Young Malagasies Determined (Tanora Malagasy Vonona), a political party in Madagascar
- Through-glass via, a structure studied for semiconductor packaging
- Troitsky Group water pipeline (TGV), Russian: Троицкий групповой водопровод (ТГВ), which brings fresh water to Kuban, Novorossiysk, Gelendzhik and the Black Sea coast — see footnotes in Abrau-Durso (winery) and Stolichnaya
