= Spectral noise logging =

Spectral noise logging (SNL) is an acoustic noise measuring technique used in oil and gas wells for well integrity analysis, identification of production and injection intervals and hydrodynamic characterisation of the reservoir. SNL records acoustic noise generated by fluid or gas flow through the reservoir or leaks in downhole well components.

== Development history ==
Noise logging tools have been used in the petroleum industry for several decades. As far back as 1955, an acoustic detector was proposed for use in well integrity analysis to identify casing holes. In this class of problems, the efficiency of noise logging was comparable to that of temperature surveys. In 1973, McKinley presented his technique for passive noise logging in which signals were recorded in several, e.g. three or four, frequency ranges at every measurement depth. This method, allowing quantitative and qualitative data interpretation, became common across the petroleum industry.

Over many years, downhole noise logging tools proved effective in inflow and injectivity profiling of operating wells, leak detection, location of cross-flows behind casing, and even in determining reservoir fluid compositions. Robinson (1974) described how noise logging can be used to determine effective reservoir thickness.

== Physical principles ==
The theory of sound generation by turbulent flow of fluid or gas through a single channel has been well elaborated by many authors, while the generation of acoustic oscillations by fluid flow through porous reservoirs is still poorly understood. Various physical models have been proposed, including the mechanism of sound generation by transient pulsing of the fluid flowing through pores with randomly varying properties (Zaslavsky, 2005). This paper also describes the effect of the elastic compressibility of the rock matrix on the noise signal generated by fluid flow. Especially noteworthy among the many sound generation models is the aerodynamic one based on the turbulence of fluid microflows escaping capillaries and entering wider pores (Lighthill, 1954). Generally, all of these existing models are valid and all of the above phenomena contribute to noise generation.

== Applications ==
1. Near-wellbore flow characterisation
  - Identification of inflow and injection intervals
  - Identification of inter-reservoir communications including cross-flows behind casing
2. Near-wellbore reservoir pressure evaluation in flow intervals including unperforated casing intervals
3. Well integrity monitoring
  - Detection of leaks in tubing, casing and other well components
