= Traffic identifier =

In a WLAN, packets can be a stream of video, voice, or data, which each have different priorities to be served by an access point. The Traffic Identifier (TID) is an identifier used to classify a packet in Wireless LANs. When a base station receives an 802.11 frame with the TID set for audio, for example, the priority given is higher than a data frame.

TID is part of a QoS concept in Wireless LAN introduced by the Institute of Electrical and Electronics Engineers in 802.11e as part of the 802.11 standards family. It is represented as a four-bit number (0-3), identifying QoS traffic within MAC data services. There are 16 (2^{4}) possible values for TID; out of them, only 8 are practically usable to identify differentiated services. The values of TID is similar to the values used in Differentiated services.

The TID subfield sits in certain MAC frames. The presence of TID, and thus the presence of QoS, is determined by the value set in the MSB of the subtype field (bit b7) of the Frame Control field. A QoS-enabled 802.11 header uses the TID to classify and prioritize processing of incoming or outgoing frames. A TID value from 0-7 are defined for user traffic priority and mapped to Access Categories (AC) while TID range 8-15 is reserved for management and control frames.
