= TF =

TF or Tf may refer to:

== Arts and entertainment ==
=== Books ===
- Halo: The Flood, a novel written by William C. Dietz and a sequel to Halo: The Fall of Reach.

=== Gaming ===
- Team Fortress, an online multiplayer video game
- Thunder Force (series), a series of shoot-em-up video games

=== Television ===
- Power Rangers: Time Force
- Turtles Forever

=== Other media ===
- TorrentFreak, a website on file sharing
- Transformers, a toy line, comic books, animation, video games, and films

== Geography ==
- Telford, a new town in the West Midlands region of England
  - TF postcode area, UK, encompassing the Telford area
- Twin Falls, Idaho, US
- French Southern Territories (ISO 3166-1 country code TF)
- Iceland (aircraft registration prefix TF)

== Businesses and organizations ==
- Malmö Aviation (IATA airline designator TF)
- Teknologföreningen, a student organization at the Helsinki University of Technology
- Temasek Foundation, a Singapore-based philanthropic foundation
- Territorial Force, predecessor of the British Territorial Army
- Serve the People (Norway) (Tjen folket), a Maoist Norwegian political organization
- Tom Ford, a luxury fashion house founded by designer Tom Ford in 2005
- Tung Fang Design Institute, a college in Kaohsiung, Taiwan

== Science and technology ==
=== Biology and medicine ===
- Theaflavin, a type of antioxidant polyphenols flavan-3-ols that are formed from catechins in tea leaves
- Tissue factor, or tissue factor gene
- Transcription factor, a protein that binds to specific DNA sequences
- Transferrin, a blood plasma protein
- Transcellular fluid, a portion of total body water contained within epithelial lined spaces

=== Computing ===
- .tf, the country code top level domain (ccTLD) for French Southern Territories
- Tera-flops, a measurement of computing speed
- TorrentFreak, a news website on file sharing
- TransFlash card, a Micro SD removable flash memory card
- TensorFlow, a machine learning library by Google

=== Other uses in science and technology ===
- Tonne-force, a unit of force
- Triflyl, an abbreviation for trifluoromethanesulfonyl
- trapped field, as in superconducting trapped field magnet.
- Tritium fluoride, a form of hydrogen fluoride using tritium (an isotope of hydrogen) atoms

== Motor vehicles ==
- MG TF, a sports car produced by MG Rover from 2002 to 2005 and by MG Motor UK from 2007 to 2011
- TF Series of Isuzu Faster, the third generation Isuzu Faster
- Berliet TF, a range of heavy-duty trucks manufactured by Berliet

== Other uses ==
- TF, a chatspeak abbreviation for "the fuck" which is used to imply confusion or shock
- TF1, a French free-to-air Television channel
- Task force, a unit or formation established to work on a single defined task or activity
- Teaching fellow, a member of the teaching fellowship
- Third Force (Northern Ireland), Ulster loyalist paramilitary movement
- Transformation (disambiguation)
