= TRD =

TRD may refer to:

- TRD (gene), encoding the T cell receptor delta locus
- Toyota Racing Development
- Treatment-resistant depression in psychiatry
- Tucson Roller Derby, Arizona, US
- Troed-y-rhiw railway station, Wales, National Rail station code
- Trondheim Airport, Værnes, IATA airport code
- Transition radiation detector
- Trinidad and Tobago, ITU country code
