= TWE =

TWE may refer to:

- Test of Written English, a required component of the computer-based TOEFL (Test of English as a Foreign Language)
- TransWest Express, an electricity transmission line in the US
- Trans World Express, an airline
- Treasury Wine Estates, a company

== See also ==
- Twe, a Cyrillic letter
