= Tel, Azerbaijan =

Tel
- Municipality
- Location within Azerbaijan
- Coordinates: 41°45′33″N 48°38′32″E
- Country: Azerbaijan
- Rayon: Khachmaz

Population
  - Total: 500
- Time zone: UTC+4 (AZT)
  - Summer (DST): UTC+5 (AZT)

Tel is a village (municipality at Khachmaz Region) situated in the northern-eastern part of Azerbaijan, near the village of Nabran. The area of the village consists of deep forest and steppes rich with natural springs. It is popular as a tourist region. Near the village is the Tel Bulaghi (spring Tel) tourism center, mainly active in summer. The population is more than 700. The main activities are agriculture, farming and some tourism services.
