= TKL =

TKL may refer to:

- Teck Lee LRT station (LRT station abbreviation), Punggol, Singapore
- Tokelau, an island country in the South Pacific Ocean
- The Kid Laroi (born 2003), Australian singer, songwriter and rapper
- TurnKey Linux Virtual Appliance Library, an open source project that provides pre-packaged server software appliances
- Tiu Keng Leng, south west part of the Tseung Kwan O New Town in Hong Kong
- Tenkeyless, a term for computer keyboards that lack a numpad
