= TBL =

TBL or .TBL may refer to:

== Entertainment ==
- The Beautiful Life: TBL, a 2009 American television series
- The Blacklist, a 2013-2024 American crime thriller television series
- The Black Label, a South Korean record label

== Computing ==
- tbl, a UNIX preprocessor that formats tables
- .TBL, a file extension for a table in List of filename extensions (S–Z)
  - TRANS.TBL, a file on Compact Disc computer filesystems

== Sports ==
- Tauron Basket Liga
- Thailand Basketball League
- The Basketball League
- Türkiye Basketbol Ligi
- Tampa Bay Lightning

== Other uses ==
- Transmission balise-locomotive, a Belgian train protection system
- Team-based learning
- Tanzania Breweries Limited, a Tanzanian brewery firm
- Triple bottom line (TBL or 3BL), an accounting framework
- Tboli language (ISO 639:tbl)
- Tall building lawyer, a lawyer working for a law firm (often a biglaw firm) that serves large corporations and wealthy individuals
- Bernard Lyot Telescope, known as TBL in French

== See also ==
- Tim Berners-Lee, inventor of the World Wide Web
