= TEU =

TEU may refer to:

- Tertiary Education Union, an education trade union in New Zealand
- Treaty on European Union, formal name of the Maastricht Treaty (1992), one of the primary treaties of the EU
- Twenty-foot Equivalent Unit, a measure used for capacity in container transportation
- Mount Teu, highest point on the island of Merelava, Vanuatu
- Chú Tễu, a puppet in Vietnamese water puppetry
- Manapouri Aerodrome, New Zealand (IATA code: TEU)
- Soo language of Uganda (ISO 639-3 code: teu)
- Theux, Wallonia, Belgium, a municipality (Walloon: Teu)

== People ==
- Gregory Teu (1951–2021), Tanzanian politician
- Teu Ó hAilpín, Irish Gaelic footballer and Australian rules player
- Teu Fakava, Tongan footballer
