= TB =

TB or Tb may refer to:

== Science and technology ==
=== Computing ===
- Terabyte (TB), a unit of information (often measuring storage capacity)
- Terabit (Tb), a unit of information (often measuring data transfer)
- Thunderbolt (interface)
- Test bench

=== Vehicles ===
- T.B. (Thompson Brothers), a three-wheeled cyclecar manufactured by Thompson Brothers of Bilston, England, from 1919 until 1924
- Torpedo boat, a relatively small and fast naval vessel designed to carry torpedoes into battle
- A US Navy hull classification symbol: Torpedo boat (TB)

Places in the United States

- Boeing TB, an American torpedo bomber biplane designed by the US Navy and built by Boeing in 1927

=== Other uses in science and technology ===
- Terbium, symbol Tb, a chemical element
- Terrific broth, a bacterial growth medium for E. coli
- Tuberculosis (TB), a chronic infectious disease
  - Tubercle bacillus, another name for Mycobacterium tuberculosis, the pathogen causing tuberculosis.
- Brightness temperature (T_{b}), in astrophysics

== Sports ==
- TB Tvøroyri (Tvøroyrar Bóltfelag), a Faroese football club from Tvøroyri
- tailback, a sub-position of Halfback (American football)
- Tampa Bay Buccaneers, a professional American football team in the Tampa Bay Area
- Tampa Bay Lightning, a professional ice hockey team in the Tampa Bay Area
- Tampa Bay Rays, a professional baseball team in the Tampa Bay Area
- Total bases, a baseball statistic
- Terry Bradshaw, professional football quarterback
- Tom Brady, professional football quarterback

== Other uses ==
- Tablespoon (tb), a rough, culinary unit of volume
- Taco Bell, an American fast-food restaurant chain
- Teboil (until 1966 TB), a Finnish gas station company
- TotalBiscuit, pseudonym of English video game commentator John Bain
- TB, Maryland, an unincorporated community
- Tambun railway station, a railway station in Bekasi Regency, Indonesia
- Travel Bug, a trackable item used in geocaching
- Tampa Bay, Florida

== See also ==
- TV (disambiguation)
