= TZC =

TZC may refer to:

- Tetrazolium chloride
- Toronto Zen Centre
- TZC, IATA code for the Tuscola Area Airport
- tzc, ISO 639-3 code of the Tzotzil language
