= TransPennine Express (disambiguation) =

TransPennine Express, the trading name of TransPennine Trains Ltd, is a British train operating company operating since 28 May 2023.

TransPennine Express may also refer to these operators:

- TransPennine Express (2016–2023), a FirstGroup subsidiary
- First TransPennine Express (2004–2016)
