= TPS =

TPS may refer to:

== Arts and entertainment ==
- Télévision Par Satellite, a French satellite television company
- Torsonic Polarity Syndrome, in South Park animation
- Trailer Park Sex, a band from Hamburg-St.Pauli, Germany
- Transmission Parameters Signalling, in DVB-T digital TV standard
- Turner Program Services, a TV syndication
- Tyler Perry Studios, a film studio in Atlanta, Georgia founded by an actor, filmmaker, and playwright Tyler Perry
- Third-person shooter, a type of action video game where player can see the avatar on-screen in a third-person view

== Government and politics ==
- Temporary protected status, a non-immigration designation in the United States
- Toronto Police Service
- Toronto Paramedic Services
- Telangana Praja Samithi, an Indian political party
- U.S. Air Force Test Pilot School, Edwards AFB, California
- Texhoma Public Schools, a school district in Oklahoma
- Tacoma Public Schools, a school district in tacoma

== Mathematics, science, and technology ==
=== Computing ===
- TPS report, Test Procedure Specification, in quality assurance
- Transaction processing system
- Transactions per second, usually in database management or digital currencies
- Transition path sampling, in rare event sampling
- Treatment planning system, in medical physics and radiation oncology

=== Mathematics ===
- Theorem Proving System, Carnegie Mellon University system
- Twin Prime Search, computing project seeking large twin primes
- Thin plate spline, interpolation technique

=== Other uses in science and technology ===
- Thermal protection system for spacecraft re-entry
- Thermoplastic-sheathed cable
- Throttle position sensor, in an internal combustion engine
- True potato seed, as distinct from a seed tuber

== Sports ==
- The Players Series, a series of professional golf tournaments in Australia
- Entities and former teams of the sports club Turun Palloseura, based in Turku, Finland:
  - Turun Palloseura, a Finnish association football club
  - HC TPS, an ice hockey team in the Finnish Liiga
  - TPS Naiset, a women's ice hockey team in the Finnish Naisten Liiga
  - Turun Palloseura (floorball), a floorball team in the Finnish Salibandyliiga

== Other uses ==
- Telephone Preference Service, a British telemarketing opt-out telephone list
- Tenants Purchase Scheme, a public housing scheme in Hong Kong
- The Pennington School, New Jersey
- The Petersfield School, Southern England
- Toyota Production System, organizes manufacturing and logistics
- Tourism Promotion Services, the trading name of Serena Hotels Group
- Turns per Second, a speedcubing term
- Think-pair-share, a teaching strategy
- Talk page stalkers, people who watch wiki user's talk pages
- Trapani–Birgi Airport (IATA code: TPS)
- The Property Store, a former property letting agent based in East Kilbride, Scotland, bought by Countrywide and folded into the "Slater Hogg & Howison" brand

== See also ==
- TP (disambiguation)
