= TMC =

TMC may stand for:

== Companies and brands ==
- Thinking Machines Corporation, a defunct supercomputer company
- Toyota Motor Corporation, a Japanese automobile manufacturer
- Toshiba Memory Corporation
- Trans Mountain Corporation
- Transportation Management Center, a division of American shipping company C.H. Robinson
- Transportation Manufacturing Corporation, a defunct American bus manufacturer
- Triumph Motor Company, a defunct British automotive manufacturer

== Educational and medical institutions ==
- Texas Medical Center, an American medical institution
- Texas Military College, a defunct American private junior college, high school, and primary school
- Thanjavur Medical College, a golden jubilee college in Tamil Nadu, India
- Thomson Medical Centre, a private hospital in Novena, Singapore
- Thurgood Marshall College, an American college within University of California, San Diego
- Thursday Morning Club, an American not-for-profit organization
- Tripura Medical College & Dr. B.R. Ambedkar Memorial Teaching Hospital, India
- Tucson Medical Center, an American not-for-profit community hospital
- Thomas More College (South Africa), a leading private school in South Africa
- Washtenaw Technical Middle College, an American college

== Gaming ==
- The Legend of Zelda: The Minish Cap, a video game
- The Mud Connector, a Web portal site covering MUDs, text-based online role-playing games

== Locations ==
- Tata Memorial Centre, a hospital and medical research institute in Mumbai, India
- Trece Martires, a city in Cavite, Philippines

== Television ==
- The Movie Channel, an American cable television network
- Télé Monte Carlo, French language television channel in Monaco
- La7, Italian private television channel formerly known as Telemontecarlo

== Politics ==
- Trinamool Congress, a state political party in West Bengal, India
- Tamil Maanila Congress, a political party in Tamil Nadu, India
- Transitional Military Council (disambiguation), interim governments in Chad and Sudan

== Other uses ==
- Trimethylene carbonate
- Third medium contact, a concept in physics
- 105.1 TMC, a radio station in Cebu, Philippines
- Taipei Music Center, performing arts and cultural center
- Thomas & Mack Center, an American indoor arena on the campus of the University of Nevada, Las Vegas
- Traffic Message Channel, a technology for delivering traffic and travel information to drivers
- Transamérica Media Company, Brazilian radio network
- Travel management company
- Transportation Materiel Command, a former unit of the United States Army
- Trapeziometacarpal joint, a joint in the thumb
- Turkmenistan Memorial Capsule, a memorial satellite
- Tmcft (TMC, tmc) (thousand million cubic feet), a volume measurement of water
