= TZA =

TZA may refer to:

- Tanzania, ISO 3166-1 alpha-3 code
- thiazolidinedione
- Belize City Municipal Airport
- The Former call sign of WRNN-TV, WTZA.
