= TCD =

TCD may refer to:

- Chad (ISO 3-letter country code)
- Teller cash dispenser, used by bank tellers
- The College Dropout, the debut studio album by Kanye West
- Transport de Chalands de Débarquement, a type of French Navy ship
- Trinity College Dublin, Ireland, a university
- The Chambers Dictionary

== Medicine and science ==
- Thalamocortical dysrhythmia, in neuropsychiatric disorders
- Thermal conductivity detector, used in gas chromatography
- Thousand cankers disease, a disease of walnuts
- Transcranial Doppler, a blood flow test
- T cell depletion
- Tricyclodecane, a chemical compound used as jet fuel
