= TLM =

TLM full form may refer to:

- Traditional Latin Mass, also known as Tridentine Mass
- Taichung Literature Museum, a museum in Taichung, Taiwan
- Télé Lyon Métropole, TV Channel of Lyon's agglomeration
- Temporal light modulation
- The Leprosy Mission
- Thetis Lake Monster
- Transaction-level modeling
- Transmission-line matrix method
- Transmission line measurement
- Transmission line modelling
- The ICAO airline code for Thai Lion Air
- The Indian Railways station code for Tirusulam railway station, Chennai, Tamil Nadu, India
- Teaching/Learning Materials, also known as Instructional materials
- Tech Lead Manager, in technology companies, a "tech lead" (also known as a lead programmer) or team leader who also has some number of direct reports, as a more traditional manager would.
