= Temo =

Temo or Têmo may refer to

- Temo (river), a river in Sardinia
- Têmo, a village in Tibet
