= TOP =

TOP or T.O.P. may refer to:

== Music ==
- T.O.P, a South Korean rapper
- T.O.P. (Tower of Power album), 1993 soul/funk album
- T.O.P. (Shinhwa album), 1999 pop album
- "T.O.P.", a 1999 song by S.E.S. from the album Prime: S.E.S. the Best
- "T.O.P.", a 2021 song by G Herbo from his album 25
- Top One Project, a Filipino band
- Twenty One Pilots, American music duo

== Political parties ==
- Tobago Organisation of the People, a political party in Tobago
- The Opportunities Party, a political party in New Zealand
- Trumpet of Patriots, a political party in Australia

== Other uses ==
- Tedcastles Oil Products, an Irish petrol company
- Test Of Proficiency-Huayu, a Chinese language proficiency test
- Third Order of Saint Dominic (Tertiarius Ordinis Prædicatorum), Dominican tertiary
- Tongan paʻanga (ISO 4217 code), the currency of Tonga
- Topsham railway station (National Rail station code), Devon, England
- Technical Office Protocol, a computer networking standard later merged with Manufacturing Automation Protocol
- Time of possession, in American football
- Trioctylphosphine, an organophosphorus compound
- Tribunal de Orden Publico, a court dealing with political offences in Franco-era Spain
- TOPS (Total Operations Processing System), a railway stock management computer system most prominently used in the UK
