= TESC =

TESC may refer to

An abbreviation for two US colleges:

- The Evergreen State College, in Olympia, Washington
- Thomas Edison State College, in Trenton, New Jersey

Venues:

- Tampere Exhibition and Sports Centre
