= TCAA =

TCAA may refer to:

- Tanzania Civil Aviation Authority
- Children's Air Ambulance
