= Treasury General Account =

US federal government cash account

The Treasury General Account (TGA) is an account maintained by the United States Department of the Treasury at the Federal Reserve. It receives tax payments and proceeds from the auction of Treasury securities, and disburses government payments to individuals and businesses. Aside from its cash flow duties, it is also held to protect the Treasury from running out of money if Congress delays raising the debt ceiling. The TGA is often described as the government's "checking account". As of 3 January 2025, the balance of the account is US$677 billion.

== History ==
Because funds in the TGA count as reserves in the central banking system, under the Fed's former limited-reserves regime the balance of the TGA was kept low so as not to influence the federal funds rate. The target balance was US$5 billion; the rest of the government's cash balance was kept at private depository institutions in the Treasury Tax and Loan Note (TT&L) program. Funds were transferred to and from the TT&L accounts daily to meet the TGA target.

Starting after the 2008 financial crisis, the Treasury began keeping almost all of its cash balance in the TGA, as quantitative easing greatly increased the amount of reserves, so a large TGA balance would no longer have an outsized effect on the system. Also, interest on excess reserves was an economic incentive to keep money in the TGA.

The balance of the TGA increased to US$1.6 trillion in 2021 as a result of increased government borrowing during the COVID-19 pandemic. During the 2023 debt-ceiling crisis, the account's balance fell as low as US$50 billion, compared to a target of US$600 billion.
