= TX =

TX, T-X, or Tx may refer to:

- Texas, abbreviated as TX

== Companies ==
=== Consumer product companies ===
- TX Watch Company, a former watch company by the Timex Group

=== Media and telecommunication companies ===
- TX Digital Illusions, a former American video game developer
- TX Group, a Swiss media company
- TV Tokyo, a Japanese commercial broadcaster
  - TX Network, a Japanese television network which flagship station is TV Tokyo

=== Transportation companies ===
- Air Caraïbes (IATA airline designator TX)

== Electronics and machines ==
- Canon TX, a 35mm single-lens reflex camera
- Palm TX, a personal digital assistant
- Sony Xperia TX, a smartphone

== Media ==
- Fenix TX, a pop punk band from Houston, Texas, formerly known as Riverfenix
  - Fenix TX, the band's first album after their name change
- T-X (Terminatrix), the antagonist in the movie Terminator 3: Rise of the Machines

== Science and technology ==
=== Astronomy ===
- TX Camelopardalis, a star in the constellation Camelopardalis
- TX Piscium, a carbon star in the constellation Pisces

=== Linguistics ===
- Tx (digraph)

=== Medicine ===
- Caspase 4, an enzyme
- Therapy, Tx or T_{x} in medical shorthand
  - Treatment group, in an experiment, such as basic research or clinical trials
- Traction (orthopedics)
- Transplant, in the context of organ transplantation
- In the TNM staging system for cancer:
  - Size or extent of tumor cannot be evaluated
  - Wildcard for any T stage (for example, a chemotherapy regimen prescribed for any T, any N, M1 = TxNxM1)

=== Telecommunications ===
- Transmission (telecommunications), generally
- Tx, the transmit signal in the RS-232 serial communication protocol

== Transportation ==
=== Aircraft and airlines ===
- Boeing T-7 Red Hawk, known as the T-X until 2019
  - T-X program
- Sperwill TX, a British paramotor

=== Automobiles ===
- Exeed TX, a 2019–present Chinese mid-size SUV
- Fairthrope TX, a 1967 British sports coupe
- Howmet TX, a 1968 American sports prototype racing car
- LEVC TX, a 2017–present British electric taxi cab
- Lexus TX, a 2023–present luxury full-size crossover SUV

=== Buses ===
- TX series, a line of coaches manufactured by Van Hool

=== Rail ===
- Tsukuba Express, a Japanese railway line abbreviated as TX
