= TRADOC (disambiguation) =

TRADOC most often refers to the United States Army Training and Doctrine Command.

TRADOC may also refer to:

- Training and Doctrine Command (Albania)
- Philippine Army Training and Doctrine Command
- Singapore Armed Forces Training and Doctrine Command
- Training and Doctrine Command (Lithuania)
- Training and Doctrine Command (Nigeria)
- Malaysian Army Training and Doctrine Command
