= The Powers That Be =

The powers that be is a phrase that refers to those individuals or groups who collectively hold authority over a particular domain

The powers that be may also refer to:

== Literature ==
- The Powers That Be (book), a 1979 book by David Halberstam
- Powers That Be, first book in the Petaybee Series by Anne McCaffrey and Elizabeth Ann Scarborough
- Powers That Be, an American comic book series published by Broadway Comics
- "The Powers that Be", overruling entities in Diane Duane's Young Wizards series
- "The Powers that Be" was the original title of "The Stone of Threbe", eleventh episode of W.I.T.C.H

== Music ==
- "The Powers That Be", a song by Roger Waters on the album Radio K.A.O.S.
- "Powers That Be", a song by Hate Eternal on King of All Kings (Hate Eternal album)
- The Powers That B, a 2015 album by Death Grips
- "Powers That Be" (Rick Ross song)
- "Powers That Be", a song by Hieroglyphics on Full Circle

== Television ==
- The Powers That Be (Charmed), characters in the television series Charmed, also known as The Elders
- The Powers That Be (Angel), characters in the TV series Angel
- "The Powers That Be" (Jackie Chan Adventures), an episode of the animated show Jackie Chan Adventures
- "The Powers That Be" (Stargate SG-1), an episode of the TV series Stargate SG-1
- "PTB" (The Pretender), an episode of the television series The Pretender
- The Powers That Be (TV series), a situation comedy
- "The Powers That Be", characters in professional wrestling series WCW Monday Nitro in late 1999
