= TJS =

TJS may refer to:

- Teguh Jiwada Saragih, Medan, North Sumatera, Indonesia
- Tajikistani somoni, the currency of Tajikistan
- Tanjung Harapan Airport, Tanjung Selor, North Kalimantan, Indonesia
- Telangana Jagarana Sena, an Indian political party
- Thomas Jefferson School (St. Louis, Missouri), an American coeducational boarding and day school
- Tommy John surgery, a surgical graft procedure also known as ulnar collateral ligament (UCL) reconstruction
- Tongxin Jishu Shiyan, a Chinese military satellite program
- Tujia language, a language of south-central China
- Tyrolean Jet Services, an Austrian airline
- Telangana Jana Samithi, a political party
- Taipei Japanese School, a school in TianMu, Taipei, Taiwan (Republic of China)

== See also ==
- TJ's former live music venue in Newport, South Wales
