= Tuv =

Tuv, tuv, or TUV may refer to:

== Places ==
- TUV, the ISO 3166-1 country identifier for the South Pacific island nation Tuvalu
- Tuv Province, Mongolia
- Tuv, a village in Hemsedal, Buskerud, Norway

== Other uses ==
- Mahindra TUV 300, an Indian SUV
- Technischer Überwachungsverein (TÜV), German/Austrian safety monitoring companies
- Toyota TUV, the Toyota Utility Vehicle
- Traditional Unionist Voice, a Northern Irish political party
- tuv, the ISO 639-3 language identifier for the Turkana language of East Africa
