= TRL =

TRL or trl may refer to:

== Arts ==
- Temporary Residence Limited, a record label
- Total Request Live, a former MTV show
- TRL Awards (Total Request Live), an Italian music award

== Libraries ==
- Timberland Regional Library, a public library system in the U.S. state of Washington
- Toronto Reference Library, the largest public reference library in Canada

== Science and technology ==
- Technology readiness level
- Telstra Research Laboratories, Australia
- Thru-Reflect-Line, a technique used for network analyzer (electrical) calibration
- Resistor–transistor logic, a class of digital circuits
- Transport Research Laboratory, UK

== Sports ==
- Tariff Reform League, UK
- Toowoomba Rugby League, Australian rugby league football competition

== Transportation ==
- Terrell Municipal Airport, Texas, US, IATA airport code TRL
- Thirroul railway station, New South Wales, Australia, station code TRL
- Tiruvallur railway station, Tamil Nadu, India, station code TRL

== Other uses ==
- The Rockin' Life, Indonesian radio network
- Turkish lira, ISO 4217 code before redenomination in 2005
- trl, the ISO 639-3 code for Scottish Cant, Scotland
