= TTL =

TTL may refer to:

== Photography ==
- Through-the-lens metering, a camera feature
- Zenit TTL, an SLR film camera named for its TTL metering capability

== Technology ==
- Time to live, a computer data lifespan-limiting mechanism
- Transistor–transistor logic, a family of integrated-circuit digital logic
  - Differential TTL, a serial signaling standard based on TTL
- Turtle (syntax), a computer data format used in semantic web technologies

== Other uses ==
- Taiwan Tobacco and Liquor, a state-owned manufacturer
- "TTL (Time to Love)", a single by South Korean girl group T-ara and boy band Supernova
