= TWS =

TWS may refer to:

== Arts and entertainment ==
- TWS (group), a K-pop boy group
- Captain America: The Winter Soldier, a 2014 film
- The Weekly Standard, a former American political magazine
- The White Stripes, an American rock band
  - The White Stripes (album), 1999 debut album by The White Stripes
- Toad the Wet Sprocket, an American alternative rock band

== Organizations ==
- The Wilberforce Society, a Cambridge, England-based think tank
- The Wilderness Society (Australia)
- The Wilderness Society (United States)
- The Williams School, a school in New London, Connecticut, US

== Science and technology ==
- Thermal weapon sight
- Track while scan, a radar mode
- True wind speed; see Apparent wind
- True wireless stereo, a bluetooth technology for headphones and speakers
- Tsunami warning system

== Other uses ==
- Texas World Speedway, a road-racing track in College Station, Texas, US
