= TQ =

TQ or tq may refer to:

- TQ (singer) (born 1976), real name Terrance Quaites, American R&B singer
- TQ postcode area, a United Kingdom postcode for the area of Torquay
- Tandem Aero (IATA airline code TQ)
- Al-Taqaddum Air Base, Iraq
- Techniquest, a collection of science and discovery centres in Wales
- Télé-Québec (TQ or TQc), a Canadian French language public educational television network
- ThinkQuest, a student webpage building competition
- Titan Quest, a 2006 action role-playing computer game
- Titanic Quarter, dockland regeneration zone in Belfast, Northern Ireland
- Top qualifier, in radio-controlled car racing
- Tourniquet, medical device
- Trigrammaton Qabalah, a system of numerology
- The Quietus, a music magazine abbreviated as tQ

== See also ==
- TQS
- QT
