= TTY =

TTY may refer to:

== Communications and technology ==
- Teleprinter or teletypewriter, an electromechanical typewriter paired with a communication channel
  - Sometimes used more generally for any type of computer terminal
    - May also be used to refer to a virtual console in Unix-like operating systems
- Another name for a telecommunications device for the deaf (TDD), a teleprinter designed for persons with hearing or speech difficulties
- tty (Unix), a command found in Unix-like operating systems

== Other uses ==
- Tampere University of Technology (Tampereen Teknillinen Yliopisto), in Finland
- Torque-to-yield fastener
