= TCM =

TCM may refer to:

== Arts and media ==
=== Film and television ===
- The Texas Chainsaw Massacre (franchise), a horror franchise
  - The Texas Chain Saw Massacre, a 1974 film
  - The Texas Chainsaw Massacre (2003 film), a 2003 remake
  - Texas Chainsaw Massacre (2022 film), a 2022 remake
- Turner Classic Movies, a U.S. cable TV and satellite network:
  - Turner Classic Movies (UK and Ireland)
  - Turner Classic Movies Germany, renamed TNT Film in 2009, now WarnerTV Film
  - Turner Classic Movies (Nordic)
  - Turner Classic Movies (Middle East and Africa)
  - Turner Classic Movies (Asia)
    - TCM Underground, a now-defunct regular programming segment showcasing independent cult films

=== Music ===
- The Color Morale, a post-hardcore band from Rockford, Illinois
- The Crystal Method, an electronic music group
- Tianjin Conservatory of Music
- Today's Christian Music, an Australian Christian airplay record chart
- Tokyo College of Music
- Trinity College of Music, a leading music conservatory, based in Greenwich, London, United Kingdom

=== Other media ===
- The Corporate Machine, a 2001 video game
- Times Community Media, an American newspaper compan
- Total Club Manager, a football management game serie

== Computing and telecommunications ==
- Thermal Conduction Module, by IBM
- Tightly-coupled memory, memory which resides directly on the processor of a computer - see multiprocessing
- Time Compression Multiplex, a time-division duplex scheme
- Toolkit for Conceptual Modeling, a collection of software tools to present specifications of software systems
- Toshiba Consumer Marketing Corporation, a division of Toshiba
- Trellis coded modulation, a signal modulation scheme for telecommunications

== Places ==
- The Computer Museum, Boston
- The Contemporary Museum, Honolulu, Hawaii, an art museum now called the Honolulu Museum of Art Spalding House
- The Children's Museum of Indianapolis, shortened TCM in its inventory numbers (for example, the museum's most famous Triceratops specimen has been named TCM 2001.93.1)
- McChord Field, Washington state, United States (IATA airport code: TCM)

== Science and medicine ==
- T_{CM}, central memory T cell, in medicine
- Theory of Condensed Matter group, a theoretical physics research group in the Cavendish Laboratory at the University of Cambridge
- Tetrachloromethane, an organic compound also known as carbon tetrachloride
- Traditional Chinese medicine, a range of traditional medicine practices originating from China.
- Trajectory correction maneuver, in space travel; see, for example, Voyager 1
- Trichloromethane or chloroform, a solvent, and former anaesthetic
- Torque-correlation model, a model of damping in the Landau–Lifshitz–Gilbert equation

=== Models and processes ===
- Three-component model of organizational commitment in organizational behavior and industrial and organizational psychology
- Total cost management, a process using principles of cost engineering for portfolio, program, and project management

== Sports ==
- Toronto Canada Moose, a tier II junior A ice hockey team based out of Thornhill, Ontario, Canada
- Twin Cities Marathon, an annual marathon in Minneapolis-Saint Paul

== Transport ==
- TCM (Macau), a bus operator in Macau (Portuguese: Sociedade de Transportes Colectivos de Macau)
- Teledyne Continental Motors, an American engine manufacturer
- Transmission control module, an automotive device
- McChord Field, Washington state, United States (IATA airport code: TCM)

== Other uses ==
- tcm, ISO 639-3 code for the Sumeri language of West Papua, New Guinea
- Tecoma railway station, Melbourne
- The Creativity Movement, an arm of Creativity (religion), a white supremacist organisation
- Thomas Cooper Memorial Baptist Church, Lincoln, England
- Tisha Campbell-Martin, American actress
- TRADOC Capability Manager, personnel responsible for US Army user requirements
