= TASM =

TASM or Tasm may refer to:

- Tomahawk Anti-Ship Missile, a cruise missile
- Tulsa Air and Space Museum & Planetarium, in Oklahoma, US
- Turbo Assembler, an assembler for software development by Borland

== See also ==
- The Amazing Spider-Man (disambiguation)
