= TNO =

TNO may refer to:

== Science ==
- TNO intestinal model, in gastroenterology
- Thai National Observatory, atop Doi Inthanon, Thailand
- Netherlands Organisation for Applied Scientific Research (Dutch: Nederlandse Organisatie voor Toegepast Natuurwetenschappelijk Onderzoek)
- Trans-Neptunian object, in planetology

== Transport ==
- Texas and New Orleans Railroad, United States (1856–1961)
- Tamarindo Airport, Costa Rica (IATA:TNO)

== Other uses ==
- Tête nucléaire océanique, a French thermonuclear warhead
- Franco-Ténois, a Canadian francophone community
- The New Order: Last Days of Europe, a mod for the video game Hearts of Iron IV.
