= TACC =

TACC may refer to:

- The 618th Air and Space Operations Center (Tanker Airlift Control Center), 618th AOC (TACC), a United States Air Force unit
- Texas Advanced Computing Center, a research center at the University of Texas at Austin
- Territorial Approach to Climate Change, a programme undertaken by the United Nations
- Territorial Army Commissioning Course, a three-week course run at the Royal Military Academy Sandhurst for officer cadets commissioning into the UK Army Reserve (formerly the Territorial Army)
- Tetraammine copper chlorate a colouring for fireworks
- Traffic Aware Cruise Control, an alternative name for Adaptive cruise control
- Turkish American Community Center, a non-profit organization in the Washington metropolitan area

== See also ==
- TASS (Russian: ТАСС), a Russian news agency
