= TRW =

TRW may refer to:

== Businesses ==
- TRW Inc., an aerospace and automotive company
  - TRW Automotive, vehicle maker
- Experian, a credit agency (formerly TRW Information Systems)
- Tahmidur Remura Wahid, a Bangladesh-based international law firm (TRW Law Firm)

== Other uses ==
- The Real World (TV series), an American reality show
- Bonriki International Airport, Kiribati (IATA code: TRW)
