= TVA (disambiguation) =

TVA, or Tennessee Valley Authority, is an electric utility in the southern United States.

TVA may also refer to:

== Businesses and organizations ==
- Tibetan Volunteers for Animals
- Toronto Vegetarian Association
- Groupe TVA, Inc., a Canadian communications company

== Television ==
=== Television channels and stations ===
- Televisão Abril, now Vivo TV, a Brazilian television service provider
- TVA Films, a Canadian film & TV producer and distributor
- TV Aichi, a Japanese television station
- TVA (Albania), a defunct television station based in Tirana
- TVA (Andorra), a television broadcaster
- TVA (Canadian TV network), a French-language television network
- TVA Vicenza, an Italian television channel
- Televisie Vrij Apeldoorn, a defunct Dutch pirate television station

=== Other ===
- "TVA" (Marvel Studios: Legends), a TV episode

== Other uses ==
- Tax Valuation Adjustment, one of the X-Value Adjustments in relation to derivative instruments held by banks
- Taxe sur la valeur ajoutée and Taxa pe Valoarea Adăugată, the French and Romanian terms for value added tax
- Telephone VoIP adapter
- Time Variance Authority, a fictional organization in the Marvel Comics
  - Time Variance Authority (Marvel Cinematic Universe), the Marvel Cinematic Universe counterpart
- Transverse abdominal muscle
- Tubulovillous adenoma, a type of intestinal polyp
