= TCP =

TCP may refer to:

== Science and technology ==
- Transformer coupled plasma
- Tool Center Point, see Robot end effector
- Topologically close pack (TCP) phases, also known as Frank-Kasper phases

=== Computing ===
- Transmission Control Protocol, a fundamental Internet standard
- Telephony control protocol, a Bluetooth communication standard
- FAST TCP, a TCP congestion avoidance algorithm
- TCP/IP, the Internet protocol suite

=== Medicine ===
- TCP (antiseptic)
- Tenocyclidine, an anesthetic drug
- Toxin-coregulated pilus, a protein that allows Vibrio cholerae to adhere to enterocytes
- Transcutaneous pacing

=== Chemistry ===
- 1,2,3-Trichloropropane, an industrial solvent
- Thermal conversion process, a depolymerization process for producing crude oil from waste
- Tocopherols, a class of methylated phenols
- Tricalcium phosphate, an anticaking agent
- Trichlorophenol, any organochloride of phenol that contains three covalently bonded chlorine atoms
- Tricresyl phosphate, an organophosphate compound

== Organizations ==
- Taiwan Communist Party, a political party in Taiwan
- Text Creation Partnership, an archival digitization effort at the University of Michigan, US
- The Children's Place, a US retailer
- The Clergy Project, US nonprofit helping clergy leave the ministry
- Top Cow Productions, a US comics publisher
- Trading Corporation of Pakistan, a Pakistani government organization
- Terceiro Comando Puro, a Brazilian criminal organization
- T.C. Pharmaceutical Industries Co. Ltd., manufacturer of Krating Daeng

== Other uses ==
- Taba International Airport (IATA code), Egypt
- Three card poker, a card game
- Two-candidate-preferred vote, in the Australian electoral system
- Tax Compliance and Planning in the Uniform Certified Public Accountant Examination (United States)
