= TRP =

TRP or Trp may refer to:

== Businesses and organisations ==
- Theatre in the Round Players, Minnesota, US
- Time Reading Program, a 1960s book club
- TransCanada Corporation, an energy company (TSX ticker: TRP)

== Science ==
- Total radiated power, related to antenna gain
- Tryptophan, an amino acid (Trp.)
- Transient receptor potential channel (or TRP channel), of a biological cell
- Transition relevance place, in conversation analysis
- Traumatic reticuloperitonitis, in veterinary medicine

== Other uses ==
- Target rating point, in broadcasting
- Tripura, a state in northeastern India (postal code TRP)
- “Taking the Red Pill”, manosphere jargon
- Target reference point, in military
