= Tow (disambiguation) =

To tow something is to pull it using a line or chain.

Tow or TOW may also refer to:

== Places ==
- Tow, Iran, Razavi Khorasan Province
- Tow, Texas, United States
- Tow Bay, South Sandwich Islands, south Atlantic
- Tow Hill, a volcanic plug in British Columbia, Canada

== People ==
- Tow (surname), a Chinese, English, or Scottish family name, and a list of people so named

== Other uses ==
- Tow (film), a 2025 film starring Rose Byrne
- Towing (film), a 1978 comedy film
- Tow (fibre), a textiles by-product
- Tug of war, a sport
- BGM-71 TOW, an anti-tank missile
- tow, the ISO 639-3 code of the Jemez language of North America

== See also ==
- Maximum takeoff weight, abbreviated MTOW
