= TTD =

TTD may refer to:

== Places and organizations ==
- Tirumala Tirupati Devasthanams, an independent trust which manages the Sri Venkateswara Temple in Andhra Pradesh, India
- Portland-Troutdale Airport, IATA airport code
- The Trade Desk, NASDAQ ticker symbol

== Entertainment ==
- Tic-Tac-Dough, a game show
- Transport Tycoon Deluxe, a computer game

== Medicine ==
- Therapeutic Targets Database, a database to provide information about the known and explored therapeutic targets
- Trichothiodystrophy, a characteristic of Tay syndrome

== Other uses ==
- Trinidad and Tobago dollar, ISO 4217 currency code
- Terence Trent D'Arby, former stage name of singer Sananda Maitreya
- Tombstone Tenzan Driver, a variation of the piledriver move used by Japanese pro wrestler, Hiroyoshi Tenzan
- True time delay, an electrical property of a transmitting apparatus
- Top Thrill Dragster, a roller coaster located at Cedar Point, a Six Flags park
- Total Terminal Difficulty, the total number of hashes on a blockchain before a specific protocol upgrade will occur
