= TSN =

TSN may refer to:

== Science and technology ==
- Translin, a DNA binding protein involved in microRNA function
- Taxonomic serial number, a stable and unique taxonomic serial number issued by the Integrated Taxonomic Information System
- The Science Network, a non-profit, web-based organization concerned with science and its impact on society
- The Sierra Network, an online space by Sierra On-Line from 1991 to 1998
- Time-Sensitive Networking, a set of IEEE 802 standards that define mechanisms for the transmission of time-sensitive data over Ethernet networks

== Film and media ==
- Televiziyna Sluzhba Novyn, an integrated TV/web news service of the Ukrainian 1+1 TV channel
- The Sporting News, American-based sports website and former magazine
- The Sports Network, a Canadian sports channel
- Texas State Network, an all-news radio network available for stations in the state of Texas
- Television Sydney, a former television station in Sydney, Australia, which had a callsign of TSN

== Other uses ==
- Thomastown railway station, Melbourne
- Tianjin Binhai International Airport (IATA code: TSN), Dongli District, Tianjin, China
- Tswana language (ISO 639 code: tsn), a language of Southern Africa
- Tyson Foods (NYSE ticker TSN), an American multinational food processing corporation
- Tan Son Nhat International Airport, the main airport servicing Ho Chi Minh City, Vietnam
