= TCA =

TCA may refer to:

== Chemistry and biochemistry ==
- Toxin complex a, an insecticidal toxin complex produced by Photorhabdus luminescens bacteria
- Tricarboxylic acid cycle, an alternate name for the citric acid cycle pathway in cellular metabolism
- Trichloroacetic acid, chemical with many applications in biochemistry, cosmetic treatments, and medicine
- 2,4,6-Trichloroanisole, cause of cork taint in wine
- Tricyclic antidepressant, a class of medications
- TCA, a codon for the amino acid serine

== Culture and media ==
- Taiwanese Cultural Association
- Tekeyan Armenian Cultural Association, a network of Armenian cultural organisations
- Television Critics Association
- The Canadian Amateur, radio amateur magazine
- Tribune Content Agency, a syndication company owned by Tribune Publishing
- Triple Crown of Acting is a term used in the American entertainment industry to describe actors who have won a competitive Academy Award, Emmy Award, and Tony Award in the acting categories
- Twentieth Century Animation, the animation division of 20th Century Studios

== Economics and finance ==
- Transaction cost analysis
- Total cost of acquisition
- True cost accounting

== Education ==
- The Classical Academy (Colorado), Colorado Springs, US
- Trinity Christian Academy (Deltona, Florida), US
- Trinity Christian Academy (Jackson, Tennessee), US

== Organizations ==
- The Consulting Association, British organisation involved in blacklisting construction workers
- Total Community Action, New Orleans, USA; non-profit supporting disadvantaged residents
- Trans-Canada Air Lines, predecessor to Air Canada
- Train Collectors Association, for collectors/operators of toy trains
- Transportes Carga Aérea, a defunct Brazilian airline

== Politics and government ==
- Taiwan Constitution Association, a political party in Taiwan
- EU–UK Trade and Cooperation Agreement, between the UK and the EU (2020)
- The Competition Authority (Ireland) (2002–2014)

== Other uses ==
- Terminal control area, a volume of controlled airspace
- Topology change acknowledgement, a message in the 802.1D Spanning Tree Protocol (STP)
- Transportation Corridor Agencies, a toll road authority in Orange County, California
- Traumatic cardiac arrest, due to trauma
- Tennant Creek Airport, Northern Territory, Australia (IATA code: TCA)
- Turks and Caicos Islands, country code
- Tropical Cyclone Advisory, tropical forecast service for international aviation safety
