= TMM =

TMM may refer to:

== Science ==
- Transfer-matrix method, a statistical mechanics method
- Transfer-matrix method (optics), a method to describe wave propagation through stratified media
- Trimethylenemethane, a reactive organic compound and a ligand in organometallic chemistry

== Software and business ==
- Tell Me More (software), French language-learning software from Auralog
- Testing Maturity Model, a software process improvement model
- Too Much Media, an American software company based in New Jersey
- Traffic Management Microkernel, a product of F5 Networks
- Translation memory manager, a software program to aid human translators

== Other uses ==
- The Maybe Man, a 2023 studio album by American pop band AJR
- Tell Me More, an American radio show on National Public Radio hosted by Michel Martin
- Texas Memorial Museum, a museum at the University of Texas at Austin in the United States
- Textbook of Military Medicine, a U.S. Army publication
- Theresa May, a Prime Minister of the United Kingdom, from her full name Theresa Mary May
- TMM, the former ISO 4217 code of the Turkmenistani manat, the currency of Turkmenistan
- TMM-1 mine, an anti-tank landmine
- The Music Machine, British radio station
