= TMO =

TMO may refer to:

- T-Mo, American rapper
- T-Mobile International AG, a German telecommunication company
- The Muslim Observer, a weekly newspaper in Michigan, United States
- Table Mountain Observatory, California
- Tenant management organisation, an organisation set up under United Kingdom law
- Thermo Electron, former NYSE ticker
- Thermo Fisher Scientific, American firm which trades on the NYSE as TMO
- Tortugas Mountain Observatory, New Mexico, USA
- Television Match Official, a rugby official who assists the referee if uncertain to make a decision
- Traffic Management Order, an order made by a United Kingdom local authority under the Road Traffic Regulation Act 1984
- Trainman Operated Crossing, a type of level crossing
- Transition-Metal Oxide (see also Surface properties of transition metal oxides)
- Traditional Martinist Order
- Trunked Mode Operation, see Digital mobile radio
- TrackMania Original
