= TRA (baseball statistic) =

tRA is a baseball statistic used to measure the performance of a pitcher. Similar to FIP, tRA uses a mathematical formula to isolate the pitcher from his defense. Thus, tRA is a defense-independent pitching statistic. Unlike FIP and dERA, however, tRA takes into account batted ball type (that is, line drives, fly balls, pop ups, and ground balls) as well as strikeouts, walks, and home runs.

== Theory and method ==
tRA was developed by Graham MacAree. According to StatCorner, "The batter may strike out looking, strike out swinging, walk, be walked intentionally or be hit by a pitch. The hitter may also hit a line drive, a ground ball, an outfield fly, a popup, a bunt or a home run. These possibilities can be regarded as being governed by the pitcher, provided that there is a large enough sample size. tRA is built around knowing how many runs and outs each of these events are worth."

tRA uses play-by-play data gathered from each MLB season in order to give each possible outcome between a pitcher and a batter a linear weight. For example, in 2008, a line drive went for an out 30.5% of the time, while it had a run value of 0.384. These statistics are used to calculate expected outs (xOuts) and expected runs (xRuns). Once these values are obtained, tRA can be converted to runs per nine innings by taking (xRuns/xOuts)*27.

Like other sabermetrics, tRA has alternate versions. tRA+ is compared to league average. For example, a tRA+ of 120 would mean that pitcher was 20% better than league average. tERA is tRA except that it is scaled to earned runs allowed instead of runs allowed.
