= TMZ (disambiguation) =

TMZ is an American celebrity tabloid news website.

- TMZ on TV, an American syndicated entertainment and gossip news television show

TMZ or tmz may also refer to:

== Places ==
- Thirty-mile zone, United States; an area defined by a 30-mile (48 km) radius of "Hollywood" used by the American entertainment industry
- Taltson magmatic zone, a geologic region of Canada
- Thames Aerodrome, New Zealand (IATA code: TMZ)

== Arts and entertainment ==
- "TMZ", a song by "Weird Al" Yankovic from Alpocalypse
- Too Many Zooz, an American music group
- Kodak T-MAX P3200 film

== Other uses ==
- Temozolomide, a drug
- Trimetazidine, a drug
- TMZ (motorcycle), a Soviet motorcycle manufacturer
- TMZ, the designation of DSB Class MZ locomotives in Sweden
- Tamanaku language (ISO 639-3 code: tmz)
