= Teragram =

Teragram may refer to:

- 10^{12} grams, or 10^{9} kilograms, or 1 megatonne
- Teragram Corporation

== See also ==
- Orders of magnitude (mass)
