= TSR =

TSR may refer to:

== Science and technology ==
- Terminate-and-stay-resident program, a type of MS-DOS computer program
- Thermochemical sulfate reduction, reducing sulfate to sulfide
- Tip-speed ratio, of a wind turbines
- Traffic-sign recognition, by equipment in vehicles

== Military ==
- BAC TSR-2, a prototype British bomber
- TSR I and II, prototypes of the Fairey Swordfish torpedo bomber
- FN Tactical Sport Rifle
- Transvaal Scottish Regiment

== Arts and media ==
- TSR, Inc. (Tactical Studies Rules), 1973–1997 game publishing company
- Télévision Suisse Romande, a French-language Swiss TV channel
- Full Metal Panic! The Second Raid, an anime
- Team Sonic Racing, a video game
- True Symphonic Rockestra, an opera-oriented project
- "T.S.R. (Toilet Stool Rap)", song from Biz Markie's album I Need a Haircut
- The Shade Room, media company
- TSR Records

== Transportation ==
=== Train ===
- Temporary speed restriction, UK railway term
- Telford Steam Railway, UK
- Texas State Railroad, US
- Toronto Street Railway (horse-drawn), 1861-1891
- Former Toronto Suburban Railway
- Trans-Siberian Railway
- Treno Servizio Regionale, Italian trains

=== Other modes of transportation ===
- Timișoara Traian Vuia International Airport, Romania, IATA code
- Traffic-sign recognition, by equipment in vehicles
- Travelling stock route, an authorised thoroughfare for walking livestock across Australia

== Other uses ==
- Total shareholder return
- Traditional Spelling Revised, a relatively conservative English-language spelling reform
- Tokyo Sun Rockers, a Japanese basketball team
