= TMS =

TMS may refer to:

== Broadcasting ==
- TMS (entertainment data), data provider
- Test Match Special, BBC cricket coverage
- This Movie Sucks!, a Canadian TV show on bad movies
- That Metal Show, an American TV talk show

== Media ==
- Hobby of Model Railroading (Japanese: 鉄道模型趣味, romanized: Tetsudō Mokei Shumi), a Japanese magazine on railway modelling
- Tokyo Motor Show, a biennial auto show in Japan
- The Morning Show (American TV series), an Apple TV drama series

== Organizations ==
- Telefonia Mobile Sammarinese, a Sammarinese telecommunications company
- The Minerals, Metals & Materials Society, a professional organization
- Texas Memory Systems, a manufacturer of solid-state drives
- TMS Entertainment, formerly Tokyo Movie Shinsha Co., Ltd., a Japanese animation studio
- Toronto Montessori Schools, Richmond Hill, Ontario, Canada
- Toyota Motor Sales, U.S.A., Inc.
- Tramway Museum Society, the operators of the United Kingdom's National Tramway Museum
- Trinity Mathematical Society, UK
- TMS (production team), an English songwriting and record team
- The Micropalaeontological Society
- Trelleborg Medical Solutions, a division of plastics and rubbers company Trelleborg

=== Schools ===
- Tech Music School, London, UK
- Temasek Secondary School, Bedok, Singapore
- The Master's Seminary, Sun Valley, California, US
- Tyrrell Middle School, Wolcott, Connecticut, US

== People ==
- T. M. Soundararajan (1922–2013), an Indian singer

== Places ==
- São Tomé International Airport, IATA code
- Tuen Mun South station, Hong Kong; MTR station code

== Science and medicine ==
=== Chemistry ===
- Tetramethylsilane, an organosilicon chemical compound
- Trimethylsilanol, an organosilicon chemical compound
- Trimethylsilyl, a functional group in chemistry
- Tricaine methanesulfonate or tricaine mesylate, an anesthetic for fish
- Trimethylserotonin, different analogues of serotonin

=== Medicine and psychology ===
- Tension myositis syndrome, a medical condition causing pain
- Total motile spermatozoa, in semen analysis
- Transcranial magnetic stimulation in neuroscience
- Tandem mass spectrometry, to analyse biomolecules
- Truth maintenance system, a knowledge representation method

== Sports ==
- Texas Motor Speedway, Fort Worth, Texas, US
- TMS Ringsted, a Danish handball club

== Technology ==
- Tape management system, for computer backups
- Tile Map Service, a standard for downloading maps
- Traffic management system
- Training management system
- Translation management system, translation software application
- Transport management system, managing software updates of SAP (STMS)
- Transportation management system, logistics software application
- Treasury management system, financial software application

== Other uses ==
- Tesla Model S, battery electric luxury executive car
- TMS (short for "The Mysterious Song"), expression for the song "Subways of Your Mind"
