= TVG =

TVG may refer to:

- Television Guyana, a Guyanese over-the-air television network
- Televisión de Galicia, a Galician television channel; part of the Compañía de Radio Televisión de Galicia, in Spain
- Time-varied gain
- TV-G, a content rating in the American TV Parental Guidelines
- TVG Network, the former name of the American horse racing television network now known as FanDuel TV
- TVG, the United States Navy's signal code for "Well done" until 1949, when they adopted the international naval signal BZ (Bravo Zulu)
- TV Gopalakrishnan, Indian singer and mridangam player
- Tatun Volcanic Group in northern Taiwan

== See also ==
- TVGN
