= TYT =

TYT, tyt, or Tyt may refer to:

- The Young Turks, an American online news show
- TYT Bank, a bank in Turkey
- TYT (Take Your Time), publications by Studio Olafur Eliasson
- Tuan Yang Terutama (English: His Most Excellency), the style of the Yang di-Pertua Negeri, governors of the Malaysian states
- Tahoe–Yosemite Trail, a long-distance trail in the United States
- Tày Tac language (ISO 639-3 code: tyt)
- Treinta y Tres Airport, Uruguay (IATA code: TYT)
