= TTO =

TTO may refer to:

- Time-trade-off
- Trinidad and Tobago, by ISO 3166-1 alpha-3 and IOC codes
- Tactical Technology Office, a division of DARPA
- Technology Transfer Office
- Toontown Online, massively multiplayer online role-playing game by Disney
- Transtrachreal oxygen, as used during Jet ventilation
- Trailing throttle oversteer, also known as lift-off oversteer
- Twist-to-open razor, a type of safety razor (see mention under Gillette (brand))
- Triple tibial osteotomy
