= TERS =

TERS may refer to:

- Tip-enhanced Raman spectroscopy
- Tundra Ecosystem Research Station, Daring Lake, Canada, a research station in the Arctic

== See also ==
- Ters (disambiguation)
