= TH =

Th or TH may refer to:

== Language ==
- Eth (ð), a letter used in Old English, Icelandic, Faroese and Elfdalian
- Th (digraph), a digraph in the Roman alphabet
  - Pronunciation of English th aspects of this digraph in English
  - Voiced dental fricative /ð/, a type of consonantal sound in some languages
  - Voiceless dental fricative /θ/, a type of consonantal sound in some languages
- Thai language (ISO 639 code), the national and official language of Thailand
- Thorn (letter) (þ), a letter in Old Norse, Old English, Icelandic and related languages
- "-th," the most common ordinal number suffix in English (in some style guides rendered ^{th})

== Places ==
- Thailand, a country located in Southeast Asia (ISO 3166 code as TH)
- Thuringia, a state of Germany
- Territory of Hawaii, formerly the Republic of Hawaii and prior to that the Kingdom of Hawaii
- Terre Haute, Indiana

== Science and technology ==
=== Biology and medicine ===
- T helper cell Th, in the immune system
- Terminologia Histologica, an international standard for nomenclature in cytology and histology
- Thyroid hormones, in the endocrine system
- Tyrosine hydroxylase, an enzyme

=== Units of measurement ===
- Thomson (unit) (Th) in mass spectrometry
- Thermie (th), metric unit of heat energy equal to 1,000 kilocalories

=== Other uses in science and technology ===
- .th, the Internet country code top-level domain for Thailand
- Thorium, symbol Th, a chemical element
- Tianhe (space station module)
- <th>...</th>, HTML element for table header cell
- Hold time (t_{h}) of a flip flop in electronics

== Groups, organizations, companies ==
- Tommy Hilfiger, an apparel brand
- Taiwan Historica, an academic institution in Nantou County, Taiwan
- Technische Hochschule, a Technical University in German-speaking countries
- Telegraph Herald, a newspaper in Dubuque, Iowa, USA, nickname
- Tabung Haji, a Malaysian government-owned company
  - Tabung Haji Plantations
- Thai Airways Company (former IATA airline designator TH)
- Raya Airways, Malaysia (IATA airline designator TH)

== Other uses ==
- Thursday, abbreviated Th
- Th (album), a 1997 album by the Glenn Spearman–John Heward Group
- TH Joias (born 1988), Brazilian jeweler and politician
- Treasure Hunt, a designation used on the collectible Hot Wheels models
