= TW =

TW or tw may refer to:

== Arts and entertainment ==
- Tomorrow's World, a British TV series
- Total War (series), a computer strategy game series
- Trade Wars, a 1984 online space trading game
- Tribal Wars, an online strategy game
- The Wanted, a British boy band
- James TW, English singer-songwriter
- The Wiggles, an Australian children's band

== Companies ==
- Time Warner, a media company
- Taylor Wimpey, a housebuilding company
- Towers Watson, a consulting firm, NYSE and NASDAQ symbols TW
- Trans World Airlines, IATA code TW until 2001
- Trinity Airways, IATA code TW since 2010

== Places ==
- Tunbridge Wells, a town in Kent, UK
- Twickenham postcode area, UK, in Greater London and Surrey, England
- Taiwan (ISO code TW)
- Tsuen Wan, in Hong Kong
- Tumwater

== Other uses ==
- .tw, a top-level Internet domain (Taiwan)
- Shorthand of Technical Writer or Technical Writing
- Terawatt, a unit of power
- Tiger Woods (born 1975), American golfer
- Transgender woman
- Trigger warning, alerting readers/viewers to a stress-related trauma trigger within content
- Tupamaros West-Berlin, a Marxist organization
- TouchWiz, a phone touch interface
- Treatment week, a pharmacological phrase
- Twi language (ISO 639-1 language code)
- Wikipedia:Twinkle, a JavaScript Wikipedia gadget that assists autoconfirmed registered users to deal with acts of vandalism or unconstructive edits.
