= Tah =

TAH, Tah or tah may refer to:

- Taiwan Adventist Hospital, Taipei
- Total artificial heart
- Tahitian language ISO 639 code
- Whitegrass Airport, Tanna, Vanuatu, IATA code
- Jonathan Tah, German footballer
- Trans-African Highway network, Transcontinental roads project in Africa
- Tah, Morocco
- Alternative English name of the Arabic letter Ṭāʾ ط
