= TZ =

TZ or tz may refer to:

== Media ==
- The Twilight Zone, an American television anthology series
- Terezi Pyrope, a character from the webcomic Homestuck, frequently called "TZ" by her friend Sollux.
- Tz (newspaper), a German tabloid newspaper from Munich

== Places ==
- Tappan Zee Bridge, New York, US
- Tappan Zee High School, a public high school in Orangeburg, New York, US
- Tanzania (ISO 3166-1 alpha-2 country code TZ)

== Science and technology ==
- .tz, the country code top level domain (ccTLD) for Tanzania
- Time zone, a geographic region which uses a common clock time
- Tz database, also called zoneinfo or IANA Time Zone Database, a compilation of information about the world's time zones
- Saxitoxin, a chemical weapon with designation TZ in the US military
- Sony Vaio TZ, a model of personal computer
- Transformation Zone, a term used in cervical cancer therapy, the area of the cervix where dysplasia and abnormal cell growth occur
- TrustZone, a security extension to the Arm architecture of CPUs, implementing a type of Trusted Execution Environment
- Lexus TZ, a battery electric full-size luxury crossover SUV

== Other uses ==
- tz, a digraph in linguistics, pronounced /ts/
- ATA Airlines (1973–2008, IATA airline code TZ)
- Scoot (2012–present, IATA airline code TZ until 2017)
