= Texas Health and Science University =

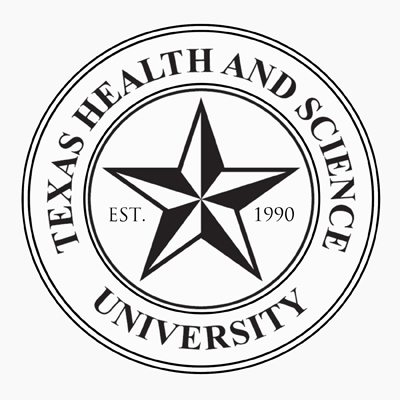
- THSU logo
- Type: Private for-profit university
- Established: 1990
- President: Louis Agnese
- Students: 80–120
- Postgraduates: 90
- Location: Austin, Texas, United States; 30.234154°N 97.785494°W
- Colors: Brown and green
- Website: www.thsu.edu

Texas Health and Science University (THSU) is a private for-profit university with its main campus in Austin, Texas and a second campus in San Antonio. It offers graduate and doctoral degrees in acupuncture, and traditional Chinese medicine with a Chinese herbal medicine specialty.

== History ==
=== Founding ===
Texas Health and Science University was founded in 1990 by Lisa Ping-Hui Tsao Lin and her husband Paul Lin as the Texas Institute of Traditional Chinese Medicine. It was the first acupuncture college in the State of Texas. The school became a candidate for accreditation by the Accreditation Commission for Acupuncture and Herbal Medicine, recognized by the U.S. Department of Education, in 1994, and has remained continuously accredited since 1996. Texas Health and Science University was the first school in Texas approved by the Texas State Board of Acupuncture Examiners to provide instruction in Acupuncture and Oriental Medicine. In 1993, Paul Lin published an English translation of the ancient text The Essentials by Zhang Zhongjing: Professional Guide to Traditional Chinese Internal Medicine. In the same year, Lisa Ping-Hui Tsao Lin was appointed by then-governor Ann Richards to chair the first Texas State Board of Acupuncture Examiners’ Education Committee.

=== Expansion ===
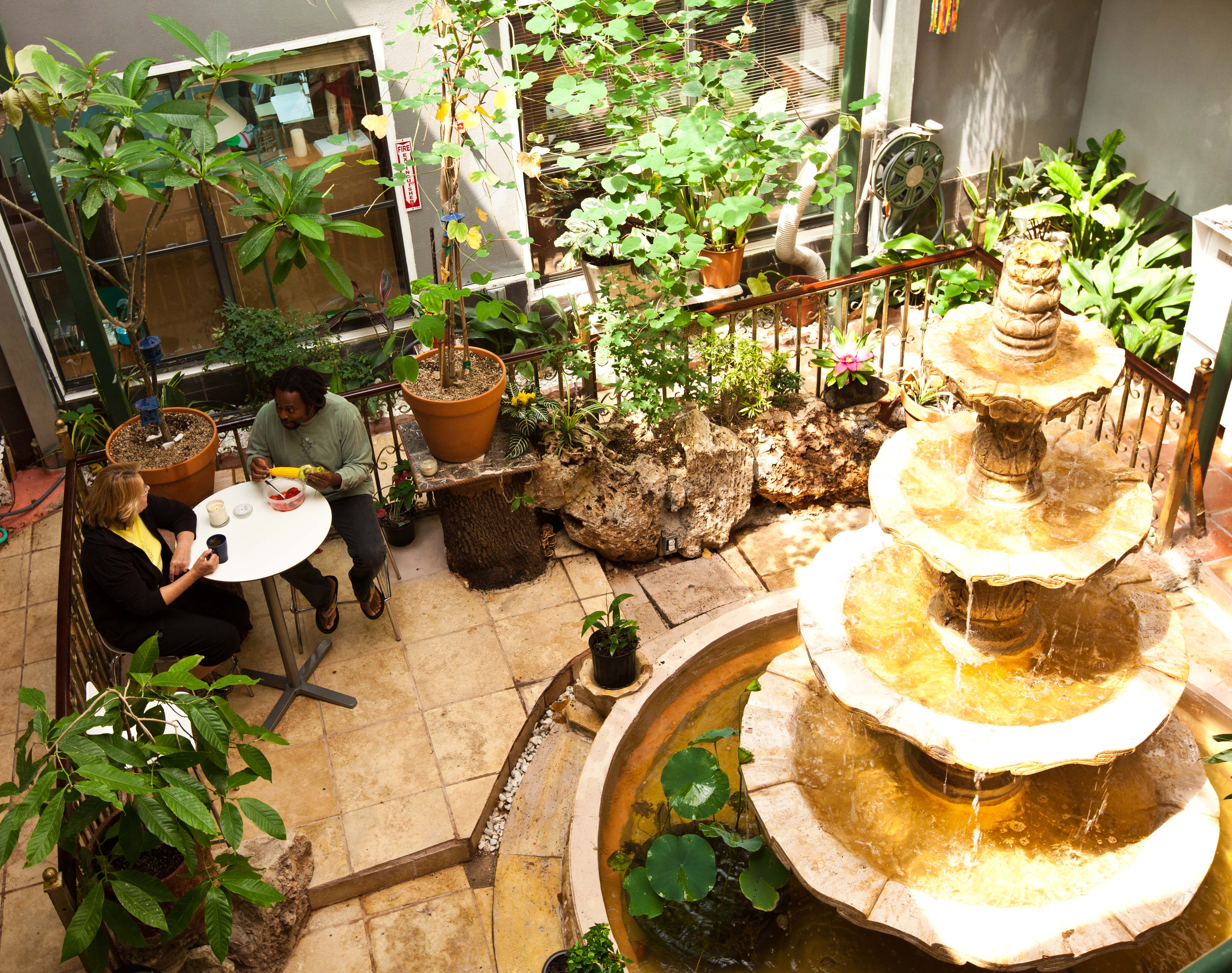
The Texas Health and Science University Courtyard

In 1997, the school was granted authority by the Texas State Board of Acupuncture Examiners to award the Master of Acupuncture and Oriental Medicine degree and changed its name to Texas College of Traditional Chinese Medicine (informally known at TCTCM). The school's program was reaccredited in 2000. In April 2005, TCTCM was granted a Certificate of Authority by the Texas Higher Education Coordinating Board to award the Master of Acupuncture and Oriental Medicine degree with a major in Acupuncture and Oriental Medicine. In April 2011, the Texas Higher Education Coordinating Board granted a Certificate of Authority to Texas College of Traditional Chinese Medicine to award the Master of Acupuncture and Oriental Medicine degree with a major in Acupuncture and Oriental Medicine and the Bachelor of Science degree in Traditional Chinese Medicine.

Texas Health and Science University has sister school relationships with eight institutions in Taiwan and China including: Xinjiang Medical University in China (since 2007); Fu Jen Catholic University in Taiwan (since 2010); Zhejiang Chinese Medical University in China (since 2010); TransWorld University in Taiwan (since 2011); Jiangxi University of Traditional Chinese Medicine International Education College (since 2011); Yunnan University of Traditional Chinese Medicine in China (since 2012); Ming Chuan University in Taiwan (since 2013); the Meiho Institute of Technology (renamed Meiho University in 2010) in Taiwan (since 2003) and the National Penghu University of Science and Technology (since 2013). THSU (then TCTCM) was awarded two consecutive "Best of the West" prizes by the TCM World Foundation, in 2000 and 2002.

=== Accreditation ===
In December 2012, TCTCM received an initial grant of accreditation from the Accrediting Council for Independent Colleges and Schools (ACICS). It was the first acupuncture school to be accredited by this accreditor. ACICS renewed the institution's accreditation in 2015 and is current through 2019 (Austin) and 2020 (San Antonio).

In January 2013, Texas College of Traditional Chinese Medicine (TCTCM) changed its name to Texas Health and Science University (THSU).

THSU and its program: Master of Acupuncture with a Chinese Herbal Medicine Specialization are now accredited by ACAHM (Accreditation Commission for Acupuncture and Herbal Medicine) as of August 9, 2023. ACAHM is a specialized accreditation agency recognized by the United States Department of Education.

== Campus ==
=== Library ===
The Library comprises two branches and contains more than 6,000 volumes, including a special Chinese language collection with over 900 titles. The English language collection focuses on medical, scientific and business subjects which support the Acupuncture and Oriental Medicine and Business Science programs. Prominent subjects include: oriental medicine, acupuncture, herbology, Taoism, biomedicine, psychology, Western medicine and business sciences. The research resources include four online research databases, dozens of print journals, and an extensive periodical collection. The Library is a member of the National Library of Medicine and shares resources with other member libraries, including the J.E. and L.E. Maybee Library at the University of the Incarnate Word in San Antonio.

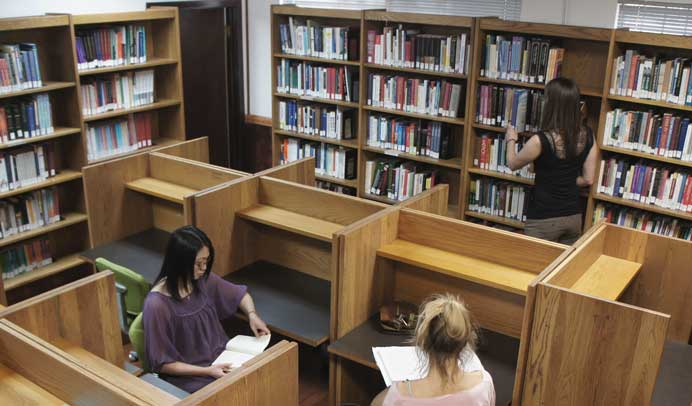
Students studying in the library at the Austin campus of Texas Health and Science University

=== Student Intern Clinics ===
THSU operates a 6,300-square-foot Student Intern Clinic with fifteen treatment rooms, an intern discussion room, a bookstore, and an herbal dispensary stocked with more than 500 kinds of raw herbs, patent pills and granular extracts from the traditional Chinese medicine herbal pharmacopoeia. The THSU Student Intern Clinic shares its facility with Austin Acupuncture Clinic (AAC), which is a professional acupuncture services clinic that is located near the THSU campus. THSU offers its students in the Master of Science in Acupuncture and Oriental Medicine Program an internship providing acupuncture treatments and receiving treatments through the Student Intern Clinic.

=== Affiliations ===
The university is a member of the Council of Colleges of Acupuncture and Oriental Medicine (CCAOM). It is also an institutional member of the Texas Association of Acupuncturists (TAOA). Texas Health and Science University has cooperative arrangements with several sister schools in Asia.

Travis County Sheriff's Office is partnering with Texas Health and Science University in Austin to offer acupuncture treatment to employees once a week for one year in their student intern clinic.

== Academics ==
=== College of Traditional Chinese Medicine ===
The College of Traditional Chinese Medicine has three-degree programs. The main program is the Master of Science in Acupuncture and Oriental Medicine degree. Students wishing to practice acupuncture must hold a master's degree in Acupuncture and Oriental medicine.

The College of Traditional Chinese Medicine, in 2014, began to offer the Doctor of Acupuncture and Oriental Medicine (DAOM) program to provide licensed acupuncturists with diverse opportunities for advanced classroom and clinic study and research in Acupuncture and Oriental Medicine. The DAOM program focuses on advanced clinical specialties, integration and collaboration in Acupuncture and Oriental Medicine and Western Biomedical knowledge, modalities, and skills.

=== Dual-degree program ===
Texas Health and Science University also offers a dual-degree program in which students may study for both a Master of Acupuncture and Oriental Medicine and the Master of Acupuncture and Tui Na from Zhejiang Chinese Medical University. The Texas Health and Science University was selected by Zhejiang Chinese Medical University (ZJCMU) in China as their partner school in the spring of 2011 principally because the traditional Chinese medicine curriculum of the Texas Health and Science University is very similar to the traditional Chinese medicine curriculum that is taught in China. Students who have graduated from THSU and passed the acupuncture certification and licensure board exams may travel to China to defend their thesis and to complete a one-month internship at the Zhejiang Chinese Medical University Hospital. Successful students will receive an additional Master of Acupuncture and Tui Na degree from Zhejiang Chinese Medical University.

=== Continuing education ===
The Continuing Acupuncture Education programs at THSU have been approved as Professional Development Activity (PDA) points for NCCAOM re-certification, and as CAE approved courses for re-licensure, by the Texas State Board of Acupuncture Examiners. Each CAE weekend at THSU provides all of the coursework that is required for re-licensure for one year.

== Students ==
=== Student body ===
One-fifth of the student population speaks and or reads Chinese Mandarin as well as English.

=== Student Association ===
The Student Association plans and coordinates community service events, hosts guest seminars, manages the student break room, and serves as a liaison between the student body and the THSU administrative staff. The Student Association also coordinates the events of the student organizations, which include the Golden Chamber Society (gardening), the Qi Gong Club (exercise), and the Calligraphy Club (art).

=== Alumni ===
More than five hundred students have graduated from the Texas Health and Science University since the first graduation in 1992.
