= List of airline codes (L) =

This is a list of all airline codes. The table lists the IATA airline designators, the ICAO airline designators and the airline call signs (telephony designator). Historical assignments are also included for completeness.

== Codes ==
Airline codes
IATA	ICAO	Airline	Call sign	Country	Comments
	AOE	Livingstone Executive	LIVINGSTONE AIR	Italy	
	LZF	Lease Fly	SKYLEASE	Portugal	
	LHB	Liebherr Geschaeftreiseflugzeug	FAMILY	Germany	
	LLD	Lloyd Aviation		Venezuela	
	LGA	Logistic Air	LOGAIR	Malaysia	
	LGC	Legacy Air	LEGACY AIR	Thailand	
	LTY	Liberty Air	SKYDECK	Netherlands	
	LWL	Lowlevel	CUB DRIVER	Portugal	
	LAX	Laminar Air		Spain	
YL	LWA	Libyan Wings	LIBYAN WINGS	Libya	
YQ	LCT	TAR Aerolineas	TAR	Mexico	
	LAH	L A Helicopter	STAR SHIP	United States	
	LJY	L J Aviation	ELJAY	United States	
	LRB	L R Airlines	LADY RACINE	Czech Republic	
	PHO	L&L Flygbildteknik	PHOTOFLIGHT	Sweden	
	LEX	L'Express Airlines	LEX	United States	
	FNT	L-3 Communications Flight International Aviation	FLIGHT INTERNATIONAL	United States	
JF	LAB	L.A.B. Flying Service	LAB	United States	
LR	LRC	LACSA	LACSA	Costa Rica	
	LDE	LADE - Líneas Aéreas Del Estado	LADE	Argentina	
KG	BNX	LAI - Línea Aérea IAACA	AIR BARINAS	Venezuela	
	LNC	LAN Dominicana	LANCANA	Dominican Republic	
4M	DSM	LATAM Argentina	LAN AR	Argentina	Ceased operations in 2020
JJ	TAM	LATAM Brasil	TAM	Brazil	
UC	LCO	LATAM Cargo Chile	LAN CARGO	Chile	
LA	LAN	LATAM Chile	LAN CHILE	Chile	
4C	ARE	LATAM Colombia	LAN COLOMBIA	Colombia	
XL	LNE	LATAM Airlines Ecuador	AEROLANE	Ecuador	Líneas Aéreas Nacionales Del Ecuador
LU	LXP	LATAM Express	LANEX	Chile	
PZ	LAP	LATAM Paraguay	PARAGUAYA	Paraguay	
LP	LPE	LATAM Peru	LANPERU	Peru	
NI		LANICA		Nicaragua	
	LSA	LANSA	INTERNACIONAL	Dominican Republic	
	APT	LAP Colombia - Líneas Aéreas Petroleras, S.A.	LAP	Colombia	
	LCB	LC Busre	BUSRE	Peru	
L5		Línea Aérea Cuencana		Ecuador	
LO	LOT	LOT Polish Airlines	POLLOT	Poland	"POLLOT" is not used in practice. "LOT" is used in almost all cases.
	JKA	LeTourneau University	JACKET	United States	
XO	LTE	LTE International Airways	FUN JET	Spain	
L3	LTO	LTU Austria	BILLA TRANSPORT	Austria	
LT	LTU	LTU International	LTU	Germany	
	JFC	LTV Jet Fleet Corporation	JET-FLEET	United States	
	LUK	LUKoil-Avia	LUKOIL	Russia	
	ASK	La Ronge Aviation Services	AIR SASK	Canada	
	LVT	La Valenciana Taxi Aéreo	TAXIVALENCIANA	Mexico	
	SKQ	Labcorp	SKYLAB	United States	
	LAL	Labrador Airways	LAB AIR	Canada	
N6	JEV	Lagun Air		Spain	
	HCA	Lake Havasu Air Service	HAVASU	United States	
	LKL	Lakeland Aviation	LAKELAND	United States	
	LKR	Laker Airways	LAKER	United States	
	LBH	Laker Airways (Bahamas)	LAKER BAHAMAS	United States	
	LMR	Lamra	LAMAIR	Sudan	
	TCR	Lanaes Aereas Trans Costa Rica	TICOS	Costa Rica	
	ISL	Landsflug	ISLANDIA	Iceland	
	PAP	Langtry Flying Group	PROFLIGHT	United Kingdom	
IK	LKN	Lankair	Lankair	Sri Lanka	
QL	RLN	Lankan Cargo	AERO LANKA	Sri Lanka	
	LZA	Lanza Air	AEROLANZA	Spain	
	LZT	Lanzarote Aerocargo	BARAKA	Spain	
QV	LAO	Lao Airlines	LAO	Lao People's Democratic Republic	
	LKA	Lao Central Airlines	NAKLAO	Lao People's Democratic Republic	Ceased operations in 2014
	LLL	Lao Skyway	LAVIE	Lao People's Democratic Republic	
	LXW	Lanexang Airways International	LANEXANG	Lao People's Democratic Republic	
L7	LPN	Laoag International Airlines	LAOAG AIR	Philippines	
	LRD	Laredo Air	LAREDO AIR	United States	
	OTN	LASTP	LASTP	São Tomé and Príncipe	
	LTC	LatCharter	LATCHARTER	Latvia	defunct
	LAF	Latvian Air Force	LATVIAN AIRFORCE	Latvia	
NG	LDA	Lauda Air	LAUDA AIR	Austria	
OE	LDM	LaudaMotion	LAUDA MOTION	Austria	
	LDI	Lauda Air Italy	LAUDA ITALY	Italy	
	LEP	Laughlin Express	LAUGHLIN EXPRESS	United States	
	LSU	Laus	LAUS AIR	Croatia	
	LAR	Lawrence Aviation	LAWRENCE	United States	
	LAY	Layang-Layang Aerospace	LAYANG	Malaysia	
	LPL	Lease-a-Plane International	LEASE-A-PLANE	United States	
LQ	LAQ	Lebanese Air Transport	LAT	Lebanon	
	LAT	Lebanese Air Transport (charter)	LEBANESE AIR	Lebanon	
	LAD	Lebanon Airport Development Corporation	LADCO-AIR	United States	
	LEB	Lebap	LEBAP	Turkmenistan	
	LCA	Leconte Airlines	LECONTE	United States	
LI	LIA	Leeward Islands Air Transport	LIAT	Antigua and Barbuda	
	LGD	Legend Airlines	LEGENDARY	United States	
	LWD	Leisure Air	LEISURE WORLD	United States	
	LEN	Lentini Aviation	LENTINI	United States	
	LOR	Leo-Air	LEO CHARTER	South Africa	
	LEL	Leonsa De Aviación	LEONAVIA	Spain	
LL	LVL	Level	LEVEL	Spain	
	LYW	Libyan Airlines	LIBYAN AIRWAYS	Libya	
LN	LAA	Libyan Arab Airlines	LIBAIR	Libya	
	LCR	Libyan Arab Air Cargo	LIBAC	Libya	
	LIQ	Lid Air		Sweden	
	LTA	LIFT Academy	LIFT	United States	
	LCG	Lignes Aeriennes Congolaises	CONGOLAISE	Democratic Republic of the Congo	
	LKD	Lignes Aeriennes Du Tchad	LATCHAD	Chad	
	LME	Lignes Mauritaniennes Air Express	LIMAIR EXPRESS	Mauritania	
	GCB	Lignes Nationales Aeriennes - Linacongo	LINACONGO	Republic of the Congo	
	GDQ	Lincoln Air National Guard		United States	
	LRT	Lincoln Airlines		Australia	
	LSY	Lindsay Aviation	LINDSAY AIR	United States	
	NOT	Línea Aérea Costa Norte	COSTA NORTE	Chile	
	LMC	Línea Aérea Mexicana de Carga	LINEAS DECARGA	Mexico	
L7	LNP	Línea Aérea SAPSA	SAPSA	Chile	
	NEG	Línea Aérea de Fumig Aguas Negras	AGUAS NEGRAS	Chile	
QL	LER	Línea Aérea de Servicio Ejecutivo Regional	LASER	Venezuela	
	LSE	Línea De Aeroservicios		Chile	
	TUY	Línea Turística Aereotuy	AEREOTUY	Venezuela	
	ALR	Líneas Aéreas Alaire S.L.	AEROLAIRE	Spain	
ZE	LCD	Líneas Aéreas Azteca	LINEAS AZTECA	Mexico	defunct
	LCN	Líneas Aéreas Canedo LAC	CANEDO	Bolivia	
	LCM	Líneas Aéreas Comerciales	LINEAS COMERCIALES	Mexico	
	EDD	Líneas Aéreas Ejectuivas De Durango	LINEAS DURANGO	Mexico	
	EDR	Líneas Aéreas Eldorado	ELDORADRO	Colombia	
	FED	Líneas Aéreas Federales	FEDERALES	Argentina	
	LMN	Líneas Aéreas Monarca	LINEAS MONARCA	Mexico	
	LIJ	Líneas Aéreas San Jose	LINEAS JOSE	Mexico	
	UMA	Líneas Aéreas del Humaya	HUMAYA	Mexico	
	LEC	Linex	LECA	Central African Republic	
	SMS	Linhas Aéreas Santomenses	SANTOMENSES	São Tomé and Príncipe	
TM	LAM	Linhas Aéreas de Moçambique	MOZAMBIQUE	Mozambique	
	LAW	Link Airways of Australia		Australia	
	WGT	Volkswagen AirService GmbH	WORLDGATE	United Kingdom	
JT	LNI	Lion Air	LION INTER	Indonesia	
	LEU	Lions-Air	LIONSAIR	Switzerland	
	LYF	Lithuanian Air Force	LITHUANIAN AIRFORCE	Lithuania	safety department
	LRA	Little Red Air Service	LITTLE RED	Canada	
LM	LVG	Livingston Energy Flight	LIVINGSTON	Italy	Ceased operations 2010
LT	SNG	LJ Air	SNOW EAGLE	China	
LB	LLB	Lloyd Aéreo Boliviano	LLOYDAEREO	Bolivia	
	LNA	Lnair Air Services	ELNAIR	Spain	
	XLG	Lockheed Air Terminal		United States	
	LAC	Lockeed Aircraft Corporation	LOCKHEED	United States	
	XDD	Lockheed DUATS		United States	
	CBD	Lockheed Martin Aeronautics	CATBIRD	United States	
	LNG	Lockheed Martin Aeronautics Company	LIGHTNING	United States	
LM	LOG	Loganair	LOGAN	United Kingdom	Gained the code LM after beginning independent operations (2017)
	CLV	Lom Praha Flying School	AEROTRAINING	Czech Republic	
	LMS	Lomas Helicopters	LOMAS	United Kingdom	
	LCY	London City Airport Jet Centre	LONDON CITY	United Kingdom	
	LNX	London Executive Aviation	LONEX	United Kingdom	
	LOV	London Flight Centre (Stansted)	LOVEAIR	United Kingdom	
	LHC	London Helicopter Centres	MUSTANG	United Kingdom	
	LSS	Lone Star Airlines	LONE STAR	United States	
	ORA	Long Island Airlines	LONG ISLAND	United States	
GI	LHA	Longhao Airlines	AIR CANTON	China	
	LGT	Longtail Aviation	LONGTAIL	Bermuda	
GJ	CDC	Loong Air	LOONG AIR	China	
	LRR	Lorraine Aviation	LORRAINE	France	
	LSC	Los Cedros Aviación	CEDROS	Chile	
	TAS	Lotus Air	LOTUS FLOWER	Egypt	
	LTW	Luchtvaartmaatschappij Twente	TWENTAIR	Netherlands	
8L	LKE	Lucky Air	LUCKY AIR	China	
	LUT	Luft Carago	LUGO	South Africa	
	LVD	Luftfahrt-Vermietungs-Dienst	AIR SANTE	Austria	
LH	DLH	Lufthansa	LUFTHANSA	Germany	
LH	GEC	Lufthansa Cargo	LUFTHANSA CARGO	Germany	
CL	CLH	Lufthansa CityLine	HANSALINE	Germany	
L1		Lufthansa Systems		Germany	
	LHT	Lufthansa Technik	LUFTHANSA TECHNIK	Germany	
	LTF	Lufttaxi Fluggesellschaft	Garfield	Germany	
L5	LTR	Lufttransport	LUFT TRANSPORT	Norway	
	LHS	Luhansk	ENTERPRISE LUHANSK	Ukraine	
	UNY	Lund University School of Aviation	UNIVERSITY	Sweden	
LG	LGL	Luxair	LUXAIR	Luxembourg	
	LXA	Luxaviation	RED LION	Luxembourg	
	LUV	Luxembourg Air Rescue	LUX RESCUE	Luxembourg	
	LFE	Luxflight Executive	LUX EXPRESS	Luxembourg	
	LXO	Luxor Air		Egypt	
	LUZ	Luzair	LISBON JET	Portugal	
5V	UKW	Lviv Airlines	UKRAINE WEST	Ukraine	
	LYD	Lydd Air	LYDDAIR	United Kingdom	
	LCH	Lynch Flying Service	LYNCH AIR	United States	
L2	LYC	Lynden Air Cargo	LYNDEN	United States	
BN	LWG	Luxwing	LUXWING	Malta	
Y9	DAT	Lynx Air	DAUNTLESS	Canada	
	LXF	Lynx Air International	LYNX FLIGHT	United States	
L4	SSX	Lynx Aviation	SHASTA	United States	Part of Frontier Airlines
	LYX	Lynx Aviation	LYNX AIR	Pakistan	
Z8	AZN	Línea Aérea Amaszonas		Bolivia	
MJ	LPR	Líneas Aéreas Privadas Argentinas	LAPA	Argentina	defunct
	LAU	Líneas Aéreas Suramericanas	SURAMERICANO	Colombia	
LT	SNG	LongJiang Airlines	SNOW EAGLE	China	
	LYB	Lynden Air Cargo	HIGHLANDS	Papua New Guinea	

== IATA Traffic Conference Areas ==
The International Air Transport Association (IATA) divides the world into three areas called the Traffic Conference Areas (TCAs) for air travel purposes. These areas are used to define geographical boundaries for fare construction and other industry-related practices:

- Traffic Conference Area 1 (TC1) – this area includes the Americas, encompassing North America (the Caribbean, Central America, and Northern America) and South America.
- Traffic Conference Area 2 (TC2) – this area includes the EMEA region, encompassing Europe, the Middle East, and Africa (North Africa and Sub-Saharan Africa).
- Traffic Conference Area 3 (TC3) – this area includes the Asia–Pacific region, encompassing the rest of Asia (Central Asia, East Asia, North Asia, South Asia, and Southeast Asia) and Oceania.

Essentially, TC1 covers the "New World", while TC2 and TC3 together cover the "Old World" (Africa-Eurasia) and the "Land Down Under".

== See also ==
- IATA airport code
- ICAO airport code
