= LTW =

LTW may refer to:

- St. Mary's County Regional Airport (IATA airport code: LTW; FAA id: 2W6), Maryland, USA
- Lufttransport Süd (ICAO airline code: LTW; IATA airline code: LU; callsign: LTS), defunct airline
- Luchtvaartmaatschappij Twente (ICAO airline code: LTW; callsign: TWENTAIR), see List of airline codes (L)
- Legal Time Window (LTW), a flag in the MPEG transport stream
- Lisa Todd Wexley, a fictional character played by Nicole Ari Parker on And Just Like That...

== See also ==
- LWT (disambiguation)
- TWL (disambiguation)
- TLW (disambiguation)
- WTL (disambiguation)
- WLT (disambiguation)
