= ITW =

ITW may refer to:

- Illinois Tool Works
- International Thriller Writers
- Institute of Technology for Women, former name of the Usha Mittal Institute of Technology
- Inter Air (ICAO airline code: ITW; callsign: INTER WINGS), see List of airline codes (I)
- Ibuoro language (ISO 639 language code: itw)
- idiopathic toe walking, a form of toe walking
- Income Tax Withholding (ITW), a type of notation found on Australian business activity statements
- Informations Télédiffusion Webmedia (ITW), French media

== See also ==
- IWT (disambiguation)
- WTI (disambiguation)
- wit (disambiguation)
- tiw (disambiguation)
- TWI (disambiguation)
