= LWT (disambiguation) =

LWT may refer to:

- Louis William Tomlinson
- London Weekend Television, ITV network franchise holder for Greater London
- Lebensmittel-Wissenschaft & Technologie (Food Science and Technology) a Swiss academic journal
- Lewotobi language (ISO 639 language code: lwt)
- Lilongwe Wildlife Trust, for the Lilongwe Wildlife Centre
- Light Weight Tank, a version of the Space Shuttle external tank
- Lincolnshire Wildlife Trust
- Lewistown Municipal Airport (IATA airport code: LWT; ICAO airport code: KLWT), Montana, USA
- Last Week Tonight with John Oliver, or Last Week Tonight, an American late-night talk show

== See also ==
- IWT (disambiguation)
- LTW (disambiguation)
- TWL (disambiguation)
- TLW (disambiguation)
- WTL (disambiguation)
- WLT (disambiguation)
