= WTL =

WTL or variation may refer to:

== Transportation ==
- Whitley Bay Metro station (rail station code: WTL), North Tyneside, Tyne and Wear, England, UK
- Westall railway station (rail station code: WTL), Melbourne, Victoria, Australia
- Tuntutuliak Airport (IATA airport code: WTL; FAA id: A61), Bethel, Alaska

== Companies ==
- Windflow Technology (stock ticker: WTL) New Zealand wind power company
- West Energy (stock ticker: WTL) Canadian energy exploration company
- WorldCall (stock ticker: WTL) Pakistani telecom company

== Sports ==
- Warszawskie Towarzystwo Łyżwiarskie (WTL), a Warsaw team in the Polish Ice Hockey Federation
- Woodsball Tournament League, an outdoor forest paintball league; see woodsball

== Other uses ==
- Windows Template Library, a Microsoft Windows programming library for Win32

== See also ==
- WTI (disambiguation)
- WT1 (disambiguation)
- LWT (disambiguation)
- LTW (disambiguation)
- TWL (disambiguation)
- TLW (disambiguation)
- WLT (disambiguation)
