= WTI =

WTI or wti may refer to:

== Organizations ==
- Western Transportation Institute, in the College of Engineering at Montana State University in Bozeman, MT, US
- Wildlife Trust of India, a conservation organisation based in New Delhi, India
- Witness to Innocence, to abolish the death penalty in the US
- World Trade Institute, University of Bern, Switzerland
- World Tribunal on Iraq, a people's court
- Western Telematic, Inc., an American computer hardware company

== Other uses ==
- Berta language (ISO 639-3 code: wti), spoken in Sudan and Ethiopia
- Ward–Takahashi identity, in quantum field theory
- Waterloo station (Indiana) (Amtrak code: WTI), Indiana, US
- Weapons and Tactics Instructor, a training course supervised by the United States Marine Corps Training and Education Command
- West Texas Intermediate, a crude oil used as a pricing benchmark
- Winnersh Triangle railway station (National Rail code: WTI), Berkshire, England

== See also ==
- WT (disambiguation)
- WT1 (disambiguation)
- WTL (disambiguation)
