= LAQ =

LAQ or laq may refer to:

- Al Abraq International Airport (IATA: LAQ), an airport serving the eastern Libyan city of Bayda
- Lebanese Air Transport (ICAO: LAQ), a Ground Handling Company based in Beirut, Lebanon
- Qabiao language (ISO 639-3: laq), a Kra language spoken by the Qabiao people in northern Vietnam and Yunnan, China
