= WT1 (disambiguation) =

WT1 is an oncogene associated with Wilms' tumor nephroblastoma cancer.

WT1 or WT-1 may also refer to:

- WT1-AS (WIT1), the WT1 antisense RNA
- Wacyk-Tyrala WT-1, a prototype Polish sport airplane designed by Stanisław Wacyk and Tadeuz Tyrala

== See also ==
- WT (disambiguation)
- WTI (disambiguation)
- WTL (disambiguation)
