= LXO =

LXO may refer to:

- LXO-103 and LXO-104, two CompTIA exams
- LXO, abbreviation for the Legion Executive Officer of the 501st Legion
- LXO, Luxology Modo file format
- LXO airline code of Luxor Air
