= Lufttransport Süd =

Leisure airline of Germany (1983–1997)

LTS Lufttransport Süd
| IATA | ICAO | Call sign |
|---|---|---|
| LU | LTS | LTS (1983–1987); LTU (1987–1997) |
- Founded: August 1983 as LTS
- Commenced operations: May 1984 as LTS; 1 November 1987 as LTU Süd
- Ceased operations: 1 November 1987 as LTS; 1 November 1997 as LTU Süd
- Hubs: Munich-Riem Airport (1983–1992); Munich Airport (1992–1997)
- Parent company: LTU International
- Headquarters: Munich, Bavaria, Germany

LTS Lufttransport Süd AG, usually shortended LTS and later renamed LTU Süd (Lufttransport-Unternehmen Süd), was a German leisure airline headquartered and based in Munich, operating charter flights to European and medium-haul leisure destinations. It operated from May 1984 until it merged with its parent company, the larger LTU, in late 1997.

== History ==
=== LTS ===
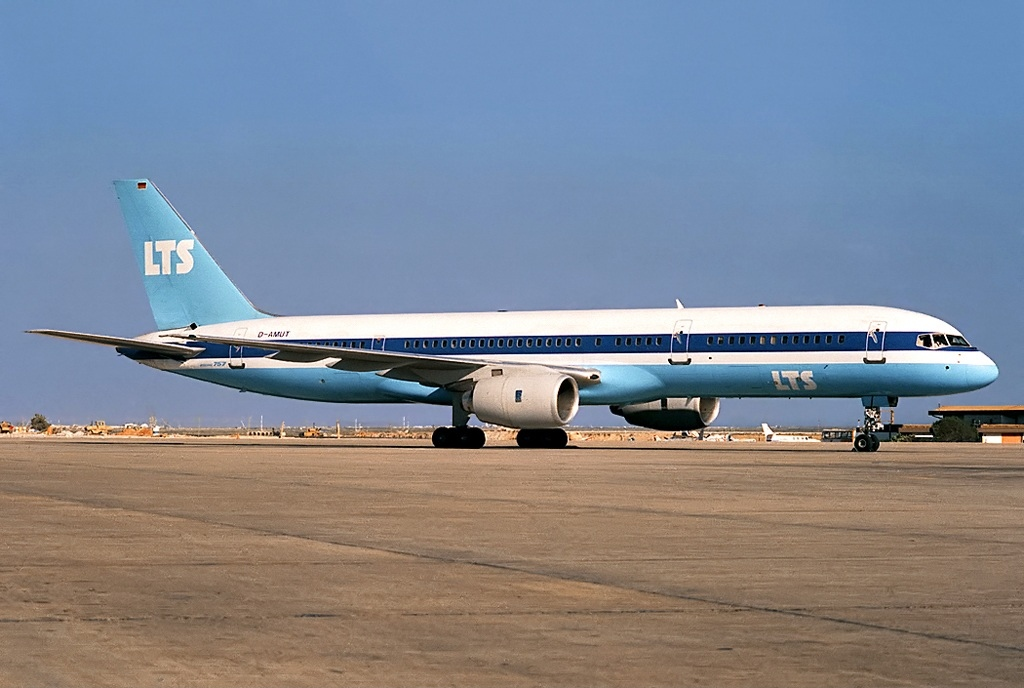
A Boeing 757-200 wearing its original LTS livery and name.

Parent company LTU from Düsseldorf, an already well-established leisure carrier, established the subsidiary Lufttransport Süd AG & Co KG Fluggesellschaft (LTS) in August 1983. LTS started with three Boeing 757s, which were soon transferred to yet another subsidiary, the Spanish LTE based in Palma de Mallorca.

Both subsidiaries were established in order to operate more cost efficient flights out of Munich with lower wage, newly hired employees. LTU mainline crews worked under very onerous labor contracts that could not be restructured unilaterally by the company. LTS was a way to circumvent high labor costs by having its employees fly with completely different contracts than those already held by LTU employees in Düsseldorf. Another reason for operating separate airlines under one parent company was that German law did not permit flight attendants to operate on more than two different types of aircraft families. During fleet transition periods, however, airlines were allowed to have flight attendants qualified on up to three aircraft. At the time LTS was opened, LTU already operated Lockheed L-1011 aircraft.

=== LTU Süd ===
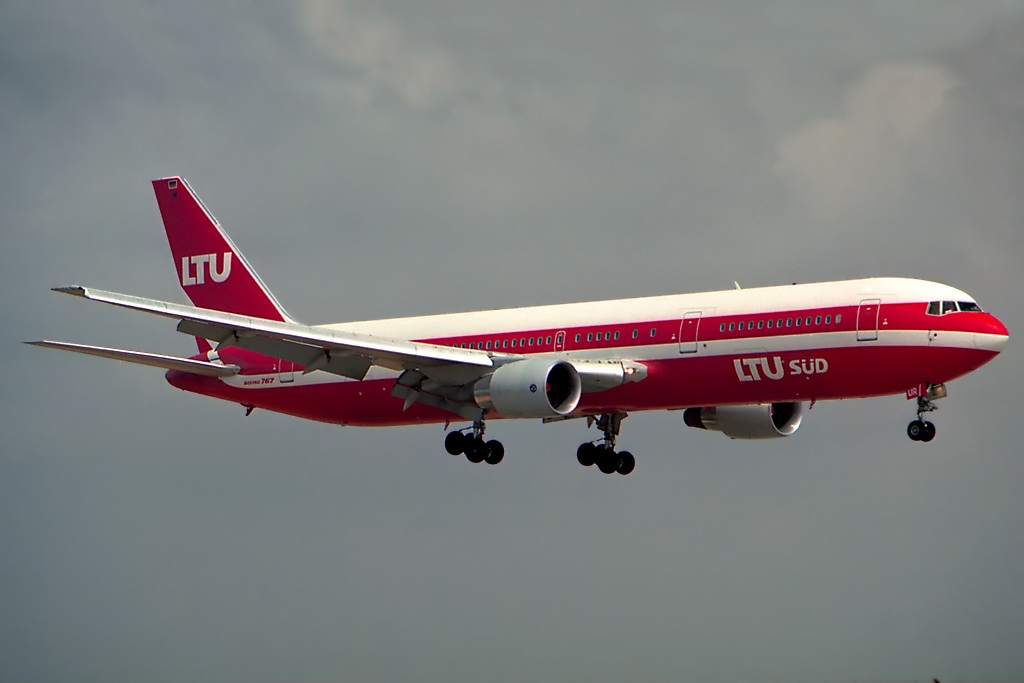
A Boeing 767-300ER in its later red livery with LTU Süd name.

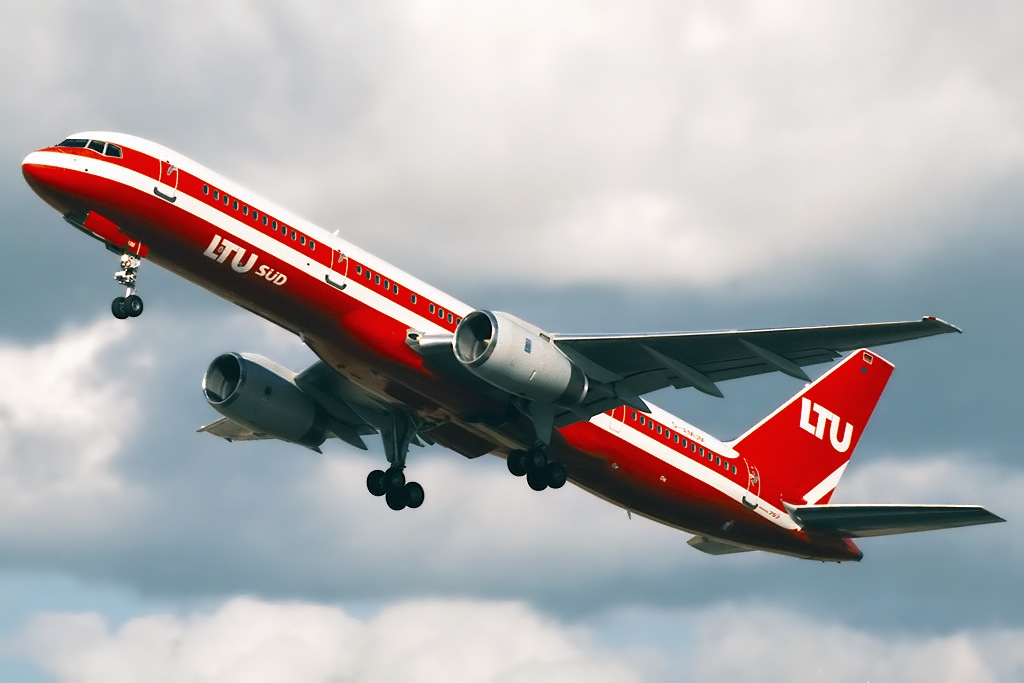
Boeing 757-200

In late 1987, LTS was renamed LTU Süd, also receiving a new corporate design to closer resemble its well-known parent company LTU. LTU intended LTU Süd to serve European, African and Southeast Asian destinations out of Munich with Boeing 757 aircraft. After the 1988 recertification of ETOPS to be allowed to fly overwater for more than 180 minutes, in January 1989 LTU Süd was delivered the first larger Boeing 767 aircraft to fly across the Atlantic and to the Far East. For the purpose of operating transatlantic flights out of Düsseldorf with the 767, LTU opened an additional crew base for LTU Süd at Düsseldorf Airport. In any case all LTU Süd flights were marketed as LTU flights. LTU Süd was dissolved and fully merged into its parent company LTU in late 1997.

== Fleet ==
During its 15-year existence, LTS operated the following aircraft:

- 13 x Boeing 757-200
- 4 x Boeing 767-300ER
