= Thomas Aigner =

Austrian documentary film producer and lecturer

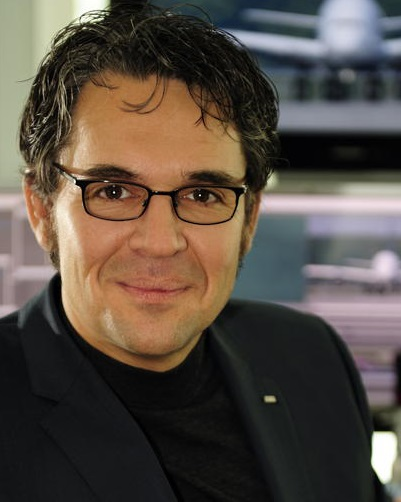
- Aigner post production PilotsEYE.tv in 2012
- Born: 14 July 1964 (age 62); Vienna, Austria
- Occupations: Television entertainer, film producer and lecturer

Thomas "Thomy" Aigner (born 14 July 1964) is a former Austrian TV entertainer and a current documentary film producer and lecturer.

== Radio and television ==
He began his career as a journalist in 1983 at ORF in Vienna, and then hosted radio-shows at Ö3.
In 1986 he debuted on public TV-channel FS1 with the first interactive TV-game show Superflip.

- (1991) Hopp oder Top (Sale of the Century) replacing original host Andreas Similia (formerly Andreas Sportelli, now Andreas Jung) for 580 shows on German's channel Tele5, he was later replaced by Hermann Toelcke in 1993.
- (1993) VoxBox, newsquix on channel VOX
- (1995) Das ist Liebe (C'eravamo tanto amati) on channel ZDF
- (1995) SimulCast TalkRadio show GongTalk (later: Talkline)
- (1995) Internet, crazy new world on channel 3sat and BayTV San Francisco
- (1996) netNite - infotainment about the "new Internet" on ZDF

== Work and Study in Los Angeles ==
In 1998, he established a correspondent's office in Los Angeles. He provided ORF with radio and TV features for the series Jolly Joker,
Seitenblicke and Look as well as German radio stations such as Bayern 3. For RTL Radio Luxemburg he produced 54 episodes
of the weekly radio program Hollywood Hautnah (Closeup Hollywood).

During his study of "Broadcast Management" at UCLA, he worked as a trainee for KIIS-FM and the show Rick Dees in the morning.

== Projects ==
In 1996, he produced the first Internet TV show on German TV, netNite, for ZDF. Starting 1998 he developed and produced the tri-medial show netRadio (broadcast, audiostream and live-cam) for Bayern3 radio station of the ARD/Bayerischer Rundfunk.
Therefore, he developed an early Second-Screen application named URLPush.

Along with the Radio and TV shows, Aigner published the netNewsletter (ISSN 1617-2116). The newsletter served 23.000 subscribers.

This netNewsletter - and the lack of a Double opt-in feature in 1996 – led to the first decision relevant to unsolicited commercial email from the federal supreme court of Germany BGH. A subscriber had mistyped his email address.
Meanwhile, the ruling has been defined even more precisely: "A newsletter that is the result of an editorial activity has both freedom of broadcasting and of expression, even if it contains advertisements".

At the turn of millennium, he co-created the art project Screenhouse, with artist Markus Heinsdorff, where websites were projected onto a 900 square metres (9,700 square feet)
exterior surface of the HypoVereinsbank headquarters in Munich.

In the year 2000, Endemol contracted Aigner's agency for the multimedia implementation of the first Big Brother TV sequel in Germany.

In the year 2001, Aigner obtained a part-licence for the radio frequency 92.4 MHz and began broadcasting on FAZ Businessradio with the daily program net.fm, focussed on new media.

Recently, Aigner has been predominantly working on the TV-documentary series PilotsEYE.tv. The actual 13 sequels show the fascination of flying through the eyes of the pilots. The viewer can enjoy the flight from the jump-seat's perspective by means six synchronized cameras in high definition. The program is broadcast in many countries, and sold on DVD and Blu-ray.

== Teaching ==
Since 2005 he is actively engaged as director of studies for the degree course business administrator marketing BAW at the Bayerische Akademie
für Werbung und Marketing (Bavarian Academy for Advertising and Marketing).

Since 2011 he has been lecturing at the BAF (Bavarian Television Academy).

== Awards ==
In 1985 Thomas Aigner was awarded the most popular radio presenter in Austria by readers of the teenage magazine "MusicMan".

In the year 2000, Thomas Aigner was included in the 100 most important Germans on the Internet list by the industry newswire service KressReport.

In the year 2000 he was awarded for the idea of the netRadio show on Bayern3 with the OnlineStar.

For the Northpole episode of PilotsEYE.tv, Aigner received a silver intermedia-globe at the World Media Festival in Hamburg in 2009.

== Publications and further reading ==
In 2001 he served as co-author for the book Streaming Media – Internet bewegter, bunter, lauter.

- Thomas Prantner, TOP 1000. Menschen, Kultur, Shopping und Freizeit, Überreuter, 1987; ISBN 978-3-8000-9025-9
- Eva Fritsch: Wo Prominente speisen", Weilburg Verlag, 1986; ISBN 978-3-9001-0040-7
- Jürgen Mayer & Thomas Aigner: Streaming Media - new technology. Internet bewegter, bunter, lauter, Markt+Technik, 2001: ISBN 978-3-8272-6143-4
- Thomas Aigner: Netmyths-with myths and legends surrounding computers and the Internet., Ullstein, 2005; ISBN 978-3-54841-238-2
