= Volar Airlines =

Spanish charter airline

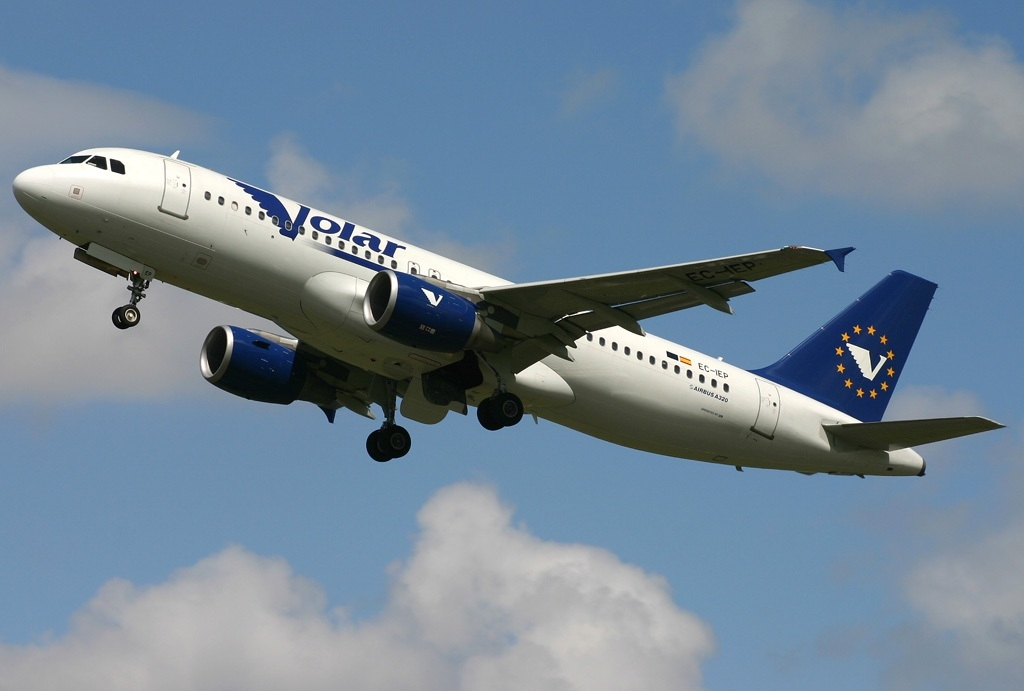
- Volar Airlines Airbus A320-214
IATA	ICAO	Call sign
-	DRS	-
- Commenced operations: 24 May 2001
- Ceased operations: 2005 (renamed back to LTE International Airways)
- Fleet size: 6 (at the time of the final rebrand)
- Headquarters: Palma de Mallorca, Spain

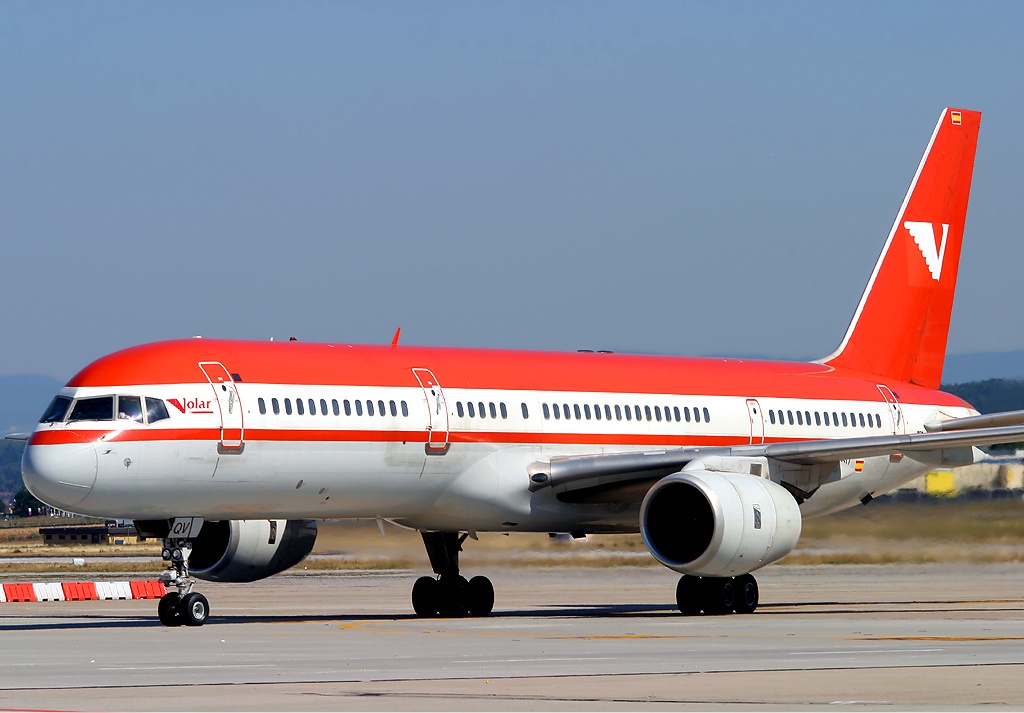
Volar Airlines Boeing 757-200, still wearing the old LTE color scheme

Volar Airlines was an airline based in Palma de Mallorca, Spain. It was a successor organization to LTE International Airways and was rebranded as LTE again in 2005.

== History ==
In 2005 the airline was renamed back to LTE International Airways. The new LTE ceased operations in 2008.

== Fleet ==
The Volar Airlines fleet consisted of the following aircraft in May 2005:

- 2 Airbus A320-200
- 3 Airbus A321-200
- 1 Boeing 757-200
