= TW1 =

TW1 or variation, may refer to:

- TW1 post code of the UK in the TW postcode area
- TW1 (Austria) (German: Tourismus und Wetter 1, lit. 'Tourism and Weather 1'), a TV channel
- The Witcher 1, a 2007 videogame that is the first in its series
- Tianwen-1 (TW-1, simplified Chinese: 天问一号; traditional Chinese: 天問一號), a 2020 Mars space probe from China
- PKP class Tw1, a steam locomotive design
- China Railways TW1, a steam locomotive in China; see List of locomotives in China
- Engineering Division TW-1, a 2-seat trainer biplane
- Training Air Wing One (TW-1), a U.S. Navy training air wing

== See also ==
- The One Winner (T1W), an eSports team
- TWL (disambiguation)
- TWI (disambiguation)
- TW (disambiguation)
