= PilotsEYE.tv =

German documentary series

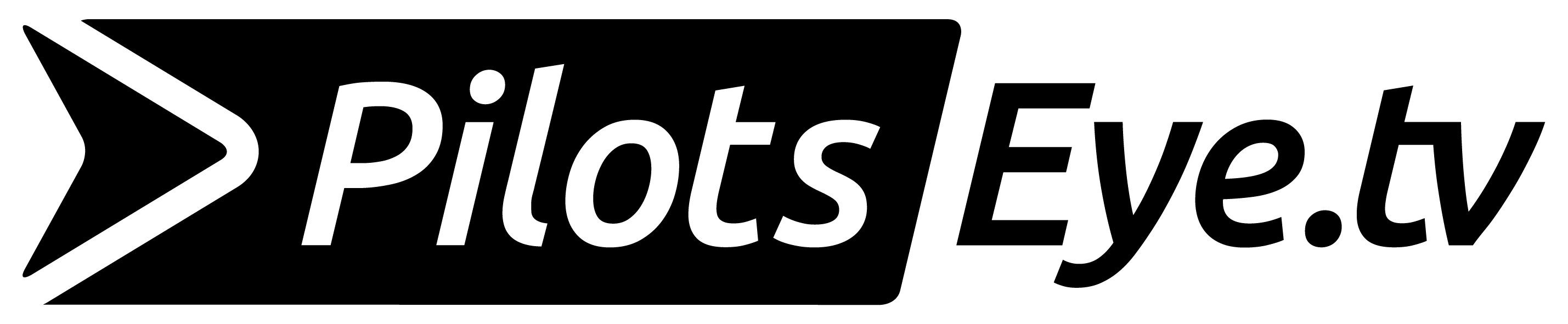
- Genre: Documentary
- Created by: Thomas Aigner
- Country of origin: Germany
- Original languages: Available in 27 languages including: English; German; French; Spanish; Mandarin
- No. of episodes: 22

Production
- Production company: AignerMEDIA (AME) GmbH

Original release
- Release: 7 July 2007 – present

PilotsEYE.tv is a German documentary series that provides unprecedented access to the cockpits of commercial aircraft. The series, produced by AignerMEDIA (AME) GmbH under the direction of Thomas Aigner, won the WorldMediaFestival "intermedia-globe" award in 2009. Using up to 14 HD cameras and eight microphones, the series captures the work of airline pilots during actual flights, offering viewers an authentic cockpit experience.

== Content ==
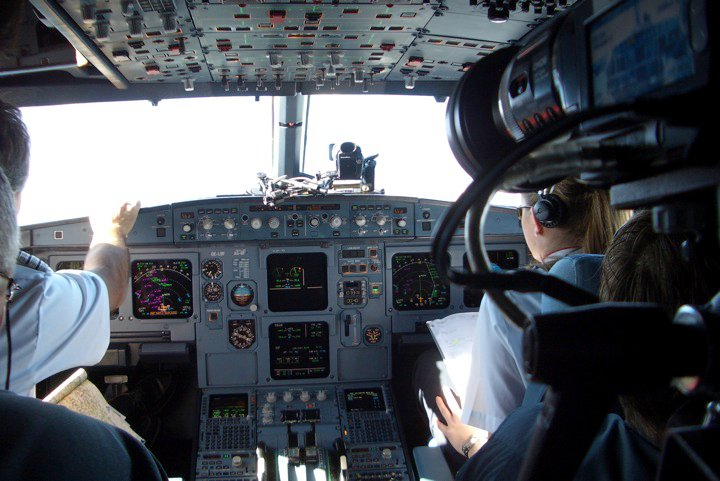
Filming for the episode "Barcelona"

Each episode documents a complete flight, from pre-flight preparations through landing, combining technical aspects with human elements. Viewers experience detailed procedures including refueling calculations, push back operations, takeoff, cruise flight highlights, and landing approaches. The pilots provide real-time commentary explaining their decision-making processes, aircraft systems, and sharing personal insights about their profession.

The series features various aircraft types, including the Airbus A380, Boeing 777, and other modern commercial aircraft. Episodes often highlight special scenarios such as challenging weather conditions, unique routes, or milestone flights like a pilot's final journey before retirement.

A special feature of the series is its multilingual accessibility, with all episodes available in 27 subtitle languages, making it accessible to a global audience of aviation enthusiasts, travelers, and professional pilots.

== List of episodes ==
Episodes No.	Destination	Movie title	Date of filming	Lead pilot	Associated pilots	Airline	Flight No.	Aircraft type	Reg.	Formats	Release date
0	Corfu	The lost tapes		Joe MOSER		LTU	LT/LTU 300/301	Airbus A330-200	D-ALPD	VoD	2009
0	Cape Town	The lost tapes		Joe MOSER		LTU	LT/LTU 673/674	Airbus A330-200		VoD	2008
1	San Francisco	The very first Episode		Jürgen RAPS	Susanne PARUSEL	Lufthansa	LH/DLH 458	Airbus A340-642	D-AIHA	DVD	August 1, 2007
2	Maldives	Nine hours to Paradise		Joe MOSER	Stefan KATER	LTU	LT/LTU 730/731	Airbus A330-223	D-ALPF	DVD Blu-ray	January 13, 2009
3	Shanghai	Engine Overheat	May 19, 2010	Thomas FRICK	Manuela DURUSSEL	Swiss	LX/SWR 188/189	Airbus A340-313	HB-JMA/D/N(Diverted)	DVD Blu-ray	February 20, 2012
4	Los Angeles	The leaders last flight	January 11, 2010	Norbert WÖLFLE		Lufthansa	LH/DLH 456/457	Boeing 747-430M	D-ABTC/K	DVD Blu-ray	May 26, 2011
5	Tokyo	Runway chicken	December 4, 2007	Fritz STRAHAMMER	Tarek SIDDIQUI	Austrian	OS/AUA 51/52	Boeing 777-2Z9	OE-LPA	DVD Blu-ray	February 1, 2009
6	North Pole	Special Flight		Joe MOSER		LTU	LTU 9999	Airbus A330-200		DVD	August 1, 2007
7	Barcelona	Special Route - Alps		Hans KLIKOVICH	Conny OLLINGER	Austrian	OS/AUA 397/398	Airbus A321-211		DVD Blu-ray	May 12, 2008
8	Seattle	Boeing Factory	July 23, 2008	Frank LUNEMANN	Sascha UNTERBARNSCHEIDT	Lufthansa	LH/DLH 490/491	Airbus A330-343	D-AIKD/G	DVD Blu-ray	June 17, 2009
9	Various	Fly Without Fear (EFFB)				Various	Various	Airbus A320 A330 A340		DVD Blu-ray	December 15, 2009
10	La Palma	Aerial Island	January 11, 2009	Thomas LINDNER		Condor Berlin	DE/CFG 596/597	Airbus A320-212	D-AICK	DVD Blu-ray	July 7, 2010
11	Hong Kong	Typhoon Warning	June 17, 2012	Joe MOSER	Alexander KLATT	Aerologic	3S/BOX 512	Boeing 777F	D-AALA/B	DVD Blu-ray VoD	July 22, 2013
12	San Francisco	A380 - The final flights of JR	May 24, 2011	Jürgen RAPS	Robert JÜLICHER	Lufthansa	LH/DLH 454/455	Airbus A380-841	D-AIMB/G	DVD Blu-ray	August 25, 2012
14	Quito	Lady's Trip to the closed Strip	October 31, 2012	Claus RICHTER	Wolfgang RAEBIGER	Lufthansa Cargo	LH/GEC 8260/8262/8263/8274	McDonnell Douglas MD-11F	D-ALCD/F/L/O	DVD Blu-ray VoD	March 24, 2014
15	Various	The Aviation Lounge				Various Airlines	Various	Various		DVD Blu-ray VoD	December 19, 2014
16	Seattle	Boeing 777F - A Plane's birth	February 11, 2015	Claus RICHTER	Manfred SCHRIDDE	Lufthansa Cargo	LH/GEC 8145	Boeing 777F	D-ALFE	DVD Blu-ray VoD	September 9, 2015
17	Hurghada	Good Bye, Boeing!	March 15, 2015	Florian DEITERS	Michail TOUNAS	Air Berlin	AB/BER 2932/2933	Boeing 737-800	D-ABMP	DVD Blu-ray VoD	March 14, 2016
18	Miami	Licence to Fly	September 20, 2015	Thomas FRICK	Jennifer KNECHT	Swiss	LX/SWR 64/65	Airbus A330-343	HB-JHB/G	DVD Blu-ray	November 29, 2016
19	Boston	A350 - Lufthansa's Next Topmodel	April 4, 2017	Martin HOELL	Hans-Peter JAEHNER	Lufthansa	LH/DLH 424	Airbus A350-941	D-AIXA	DVD Blu-ray	October 17, 2017
20	Bangkok	Joe Moser's Final Approach	January 23, 2018	Joe MOSER	Kai DÖMKES	Aerologic	3S/BOX 530/531	Boeing 777F	D-AALE/G/I	DVD Blu-ray	December 14, 2018
21	London City Airport	Water Landing	May 23, 2018	Peter KOCH	Tina SCHWABE	Swiss	LX/SWR 450/451	Bombardier CS100	HB-JBG	DVD Blu-ray	November 2019
23	Mauritius	From Purser to Pilot		Pierre ATLIHAN	Erich PRASLER	Condor	DE2314	Airbus A330-941		DVD Blu-ray VoD Amazon Prime	December 2024

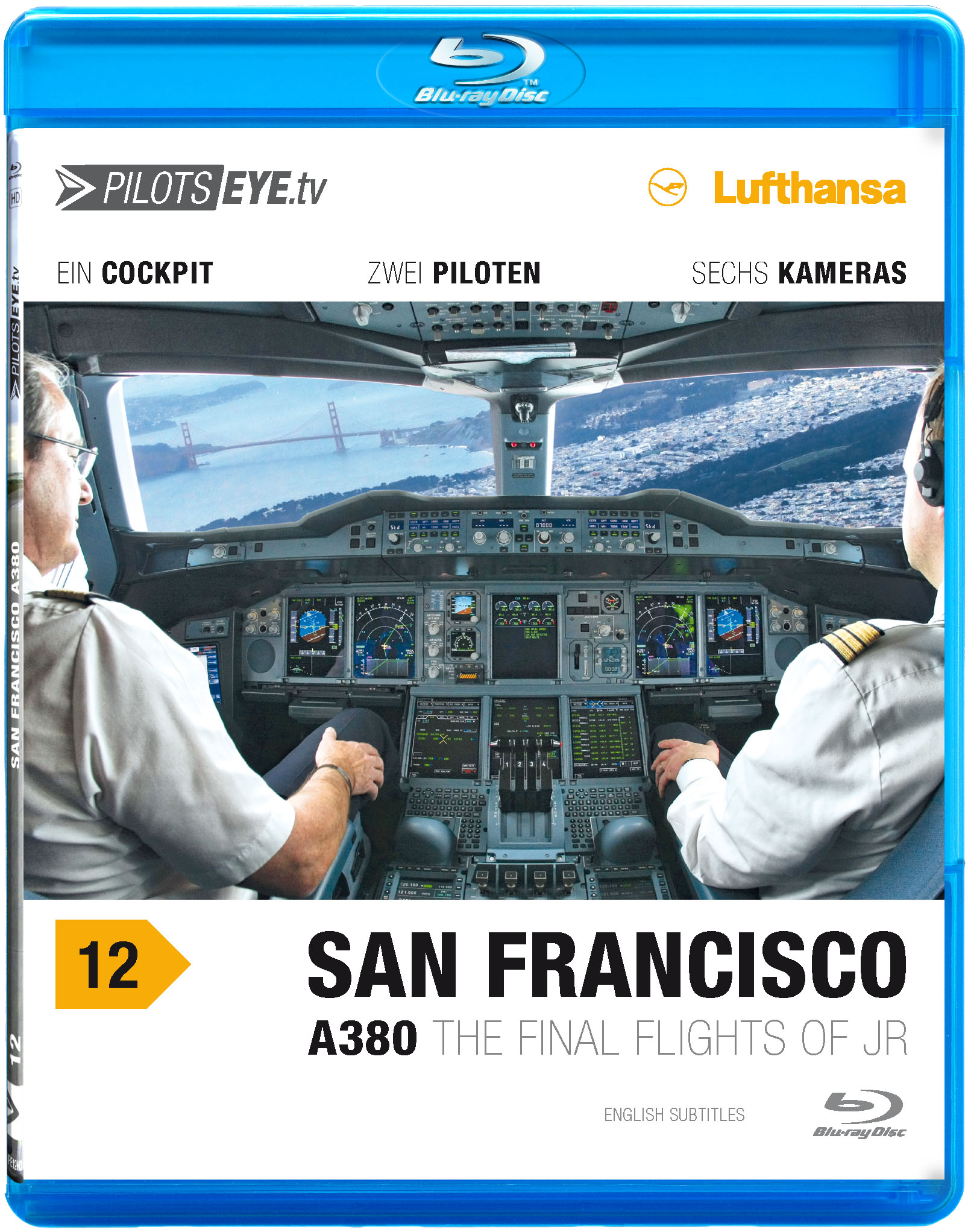
SAN FRANCISCO A380 The final flights of JR
