= WT1-AS =

Identifiers
- Aliases: WT1-AS, WIT-1, WIT1, WT1-AS1, WT1 antisense RNA
- External IDs: OMIM: 607899; GeneCards: WT1-AS

Gene location (Human)
Chr.	Chromosome 11 (human)
Band	11p13	Start	32,435,518 bp
Band	11p13	End	32,500,632 bp
RNA expression pattern
Bgee	Human / Mouse (ortholog); Top expressed in: right uterine tube; left ovary; right ovary; body of uterus; left uterine tube; myometrium; endometrium; canal of the cervix; ectocervix; spleen / n/a; More reference expression data
BioGPS	n/a
Orthologs
Databases	NCBI: entry; OMA: entry
Species	Human	Mouse
Entrez	51352	n/a
Ensembl	ENSG00000183242	n/a
UniProt	n a	n/a
RefSeq (mRNA)	NM_015855	n/a
RefSeq (protein)	n/a	n/a
Location (UCSC)	Chr 11: 32.44 – 32.5 Mb	n/a
PubMed search		n/a
- Wikidata
View/Edit Human

In molecular biology, WT1 antisense RNA (non-protein coding), also known as WT1-AS or WIT1, is a long non-coding RNA. In humans, it is found on chromosome 11 and is expressed in kidney. It is transcribed in the opposite direction to the WT1 gene. It is functionally imprinted in the human kidney, where only the paternal allele is expressed, but not in the foetal kidney.

== See also ==
- Long noncoding RNA
