= True Love Waits =

True Love Waits may refer to:

- True Love Waits (organization), an international Christian organization promoting sexual abstinence until marriage.
- "True Love Waits" (song), a song by Radiohead
- True Love Waits (album), a 2003 Radiohead tribute album by Christopher O'Riley
- True Love Waits (film) or Taivas tiellä, a 2000 Finnish film directed by Johanna Vuoksenmaa

== See also ==
- "True Love Ways", a 1960 song by Buddy Holly, covered by several other artists
