= LUKoil-Avia =

Russian airline

LLC "LUKOIL-AVIA" ООО «ЛУКОЙЛ-АВИА»
IATA	ICAO	Call sign
-	LUK	LUKOIL
- Founded: 1994
- Hubs: Moscow, Astrakhan, Kaliningrad
- Fleet size: 8
- Parent company: Lukoil
- Headquarters: Moscow, Russia, Pokrovsky Boulevard 3, bld. 1
- Key people: Andrey Kalchenko (General-Director)

LUKOIL-AVIA is a Russian airline, a subsidiary of LUKOIL, engaged in the transportation of passengers, cargo and mail. It is currently banned from flying in the EU.

== Fleet ==
As of February 2022, the LUKOIL-AVIA fleet included:

LUKOIL-AVIA Air fleet
Type	Operated	Ordered	Notes
Beechcraft King Air 350	2	0	
Mi-8MTV-1	6	0	
Total	8	0	

== Incidents ==
On August 6, 2013, an Mi-8 helicopter carrying employees of three Lukoil organizations made a hard landing at the Toboiskoye field. No one was seriously injured.
