= Línea Aérea Cuencana =

IATA	ICAO	Call sign
L5	LAC	LACECUADOR
- Founded: 2012
- Ceased operations: 2018
- Hubs: Cotopaxi International Airport
- Fleet size: 1
- Destinations: 3
- Headquarters: Cuenca, Ecuador
- Key people: Luis Miguel Astudillo (Owner)
- Website: lacecuador.com

LAC Línea Aérea Cuencana was an airline based in Cuenca, Ecuador. In 2018, the airline ceased all operations.

== Fleet ==
The Línea Aérea Cuencana fleet consists of the following aircraft (as of August 2016):

LAC fleet
Aircraft	In fleet	Orders	Passengers
Boeing 737-500	1	—	
Total	1		

The airline previously operated the following aircraft:

- 1 Bombardier CRJ700
