= WT =

WT or Wt may refer to:

- Weight

== People ==
- Watertender, a former petty officer rating in the United States Navy
- Weapons technician, a former petty officer rating in the United States Navy
- Robert Wight (1796–1872), in botanical taxonomy, abbreviated Wt

== Places ==
- Washington Territory, a U.S. territory from 1853 to 1889

== In martial arts ==
- Wing Tsun, a Chinese martial arts form
- World Taekwondo, the international federation governing the sport of taekwondo

== In science ==
- wt%, percentage by weight, in chemistry
- Wild type (wt), in genetics, denoting a control or unaltered form
- Wilms' tumor, a cancer of the kidneys that typically occurs in children

== In transportation ==
- Well tank, a type of locomotive
- Wasaya Airways (IATA airline code: WT; ICAO airline code WSG)
- Wates railway station, Special Region of Yogyakarta, Indonesia (station code: WT)
- UCI WorldTour, a cycling classification

== In technology ==
- Wt (web toolkit), a web application framework for the C++ programming language
- WT Social, a microblogging and social networking service
- Wavelet transform, a time-frequency decomposition of a signal or function
- Wireless telegraphy or telephony, an early term for radio communications

== On wikis ==
- Wikitravel, a collaborative travel guide project
- Wiktionary, a collaborative dictionary
- WikiTribune, online news website

== Other uses ==
- The Washington Times, a daily newspaper in Washington, D.C.
- Tornado watch, encoded as WT in the US Emergency Alert System
- West Texas A&M University
- Working title, used in trade publications to indicate a preliminary title of a creative work
- War Thunder, a vehicular combat multiplayer video game
- "Weight throw" athletics abbreviation in track and field

== See also ==
- TW (disambiguation)
- WT1 (disambiguation)
