= Tiw =

Tiw, TiW or TIW may refer to:

- Tiw (Uru god), an Incan god
- Týr, a god in Germanic paganism, spelled Tiw in Old English
- Telesystems International Wireless, a Canadian global mobile communications operator
- Tropical instability waves, a westward-propagating wave
- Tiw Valley, named after the Norse god Týr
- Tactical Imagery-Intelligence Wing, responsible for the processing of fast-jet electro-optic imagery
- Tin Wan station, by MTR station code
- Tacoma Narrows Airport, by IATA code
- Titanium Tungsten (TiW), a titanium alloy used in the semiconductor industry
- tîw, Sindarin alternate name for the Tengwar in J.R.R. Tolkien's legendarium
