= LTU International =

Leisure airline of Germany (1955–2009)

LTU Lufttransport Unternehmen

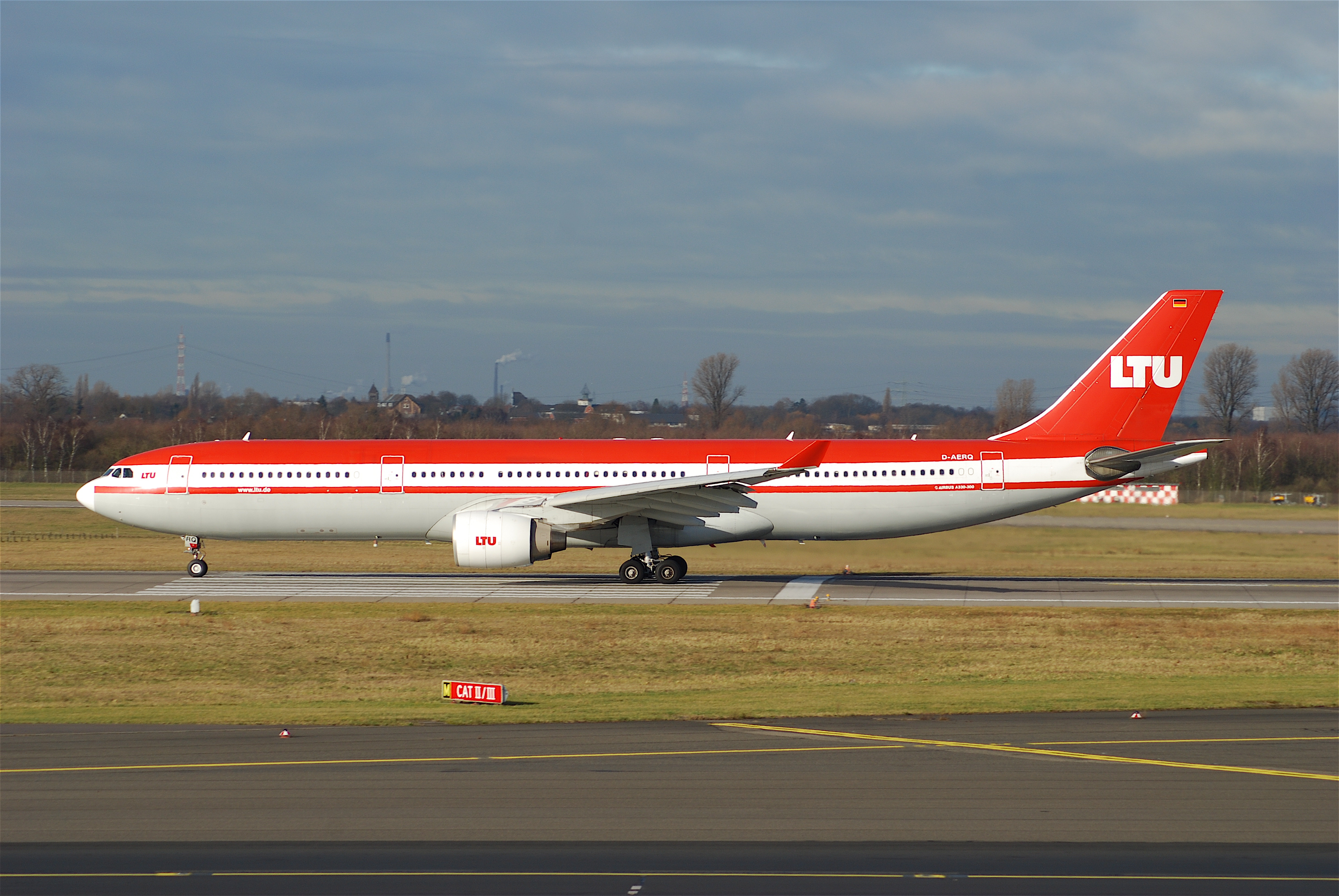
- Airbus A330-300
IATA	ICAO	Call sign
LT	LTU	LTU
- Founded: 20 October 1955 as Lufttransport Union
- Commenced operations: 4 March 1956 as Lufttransport Union
- Ceased operations: 13 October 2009 when merged into Air Berlin
- Hubs: Berlin–Tegel; Düsseldorf; Munich
- Frequent-flyer program: Qualiflyer (1992–2002); LTU Redpoints (2002–2007); topbonus (2007–2009)
- Subsidiaries: LTE International Airways (1987–2001); Lufttransport Süd (1983–1998); LTU Austria (2004–2008)
- Parent company: Air Berlin
- Headquarters: Düsseldorf, North Rhine-Westphalia, Germany
- Key people: Helmut Weixler (CEO)
- Website: ltu.com

LTU-Lufttransport Unternehmen GmbH or LTU International Airways (usually shortened to LTU) was a German leisure airline headquartered in Düsseldorf. It operated medium- and long-haul routes and maintained hubs in Düsseldorf, Munich and at Tegel Airport in Berlin. LTU was acquired by Air Berlin in 2007. Use of the LTU brand ceased in October 2009, and LTU itself was dissolved in April 2011.

== History ==
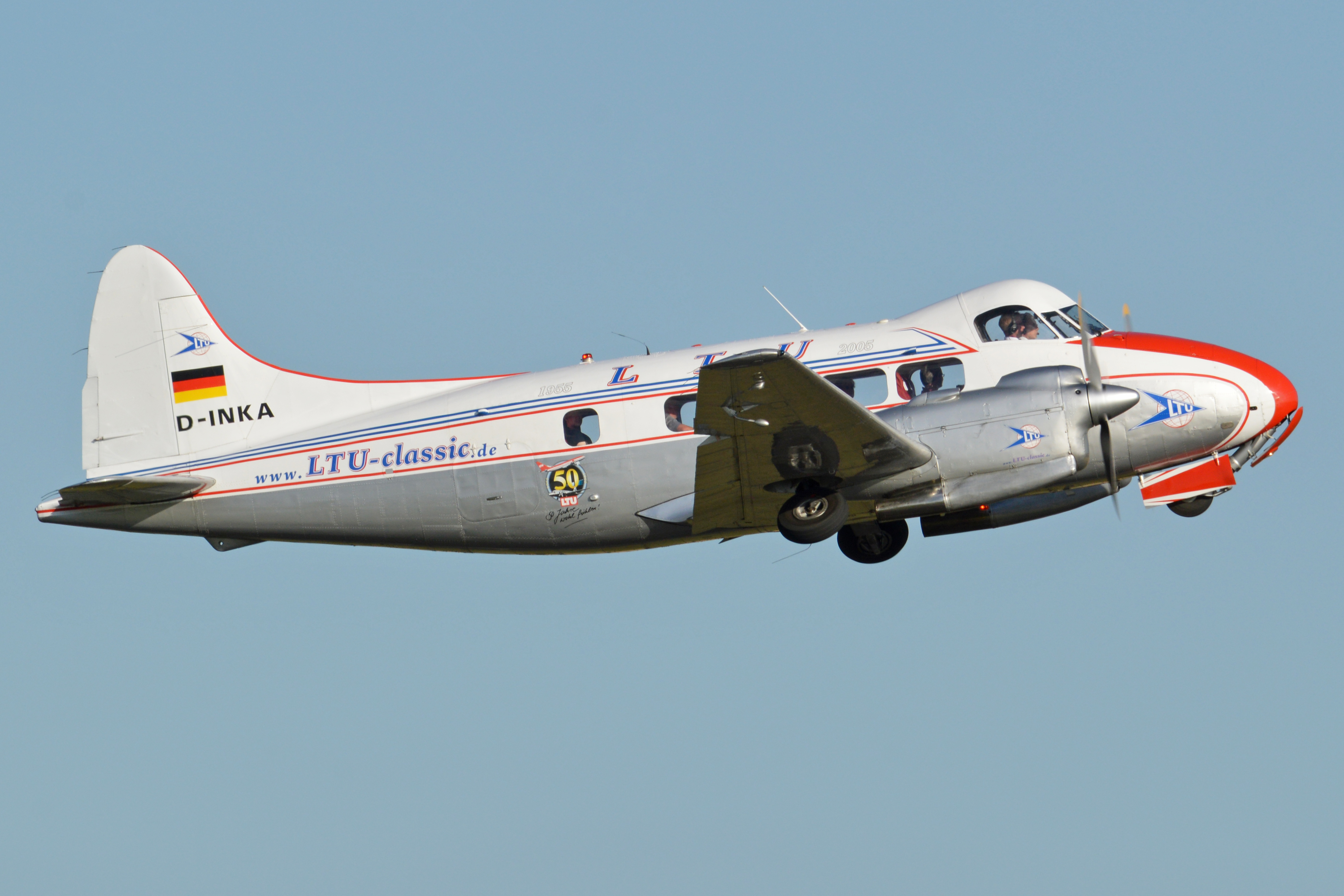
Refurbished de Havilland DH.104 Dove in historic livery celebrating LTU's 50th anniversary.

=== Early years ===
Lufttransport Union was established on 20 October 1955. Flight operations were launched on 4 March of the following year from Frankfurt airport and shortly thereafter the first charter flights were started. The initial fleet consisted of Vickers VC.1 Vikings but later a Bristol 170 was also added for the transport of goods. In the following years there were no changes to the business except for the name change to Lufttransport Unternehmen GmbH in 1958, quickly branded LTU. The initials stood for the German phrase LuftTransport-Unternehmen which translates to "air transport enterprise". This was also done to avoid confusion with a freight forwarder who had the same name. A Douglas DC 4 was used briefly for longer routes, but it was not the ideal aircraft for these tasks.

The turning point came in April 1960 when two airline's pilots, Ernst-Jürgen Ahrens and Wolfgang Kraus, took over the reins of the company. The first decisions made were to leave Frankfurt airport and reequip with new and different aircraft. LTU was headquartered in Düsseldorf in 1961. As for the fleet, the first newcomer was the Fokker 27, one leased and five more would be quickly purchased. In 1965, it was the turn of the SE-210 Caravelle series III, two aircraft, later partly "exchanged" for five of the more updated 10R series. In 1969, it was the turn of the Fokker 28, purchased in four units, for which LTU was the launch customer. The airline considered it perfect for all those activities where the capacity of the Caravelle would have been excessive compared to the actual demand. As proof of all this, the jetliner was operated to "difficult" airports (such as Villanova d'Albenga in Italy) or with unpaved runways. In the years 1968-1968 the destinatins in the Mediterranean basin and in the Canary islands reached 28. Between 1966 and 1966, some scheduled flights were carried out with Fokker 27 on behalf of Lufthansa.

The growth of its activities and, more generally, of all tourist and holiday traffic in Germany in the 1970s required a change in strategy: abandoning all short- and medium-haul activities and enhancing long-haul ones. Over the years, LTU became one of the biggest and most renowned German leisure airlines and operated worldwide charter flights from many German airports, but mainly from its main hub in Düsseldorf. A change-over to wide-body aircraft became an increasingly necessity.

=== Turning point in 1970s ===
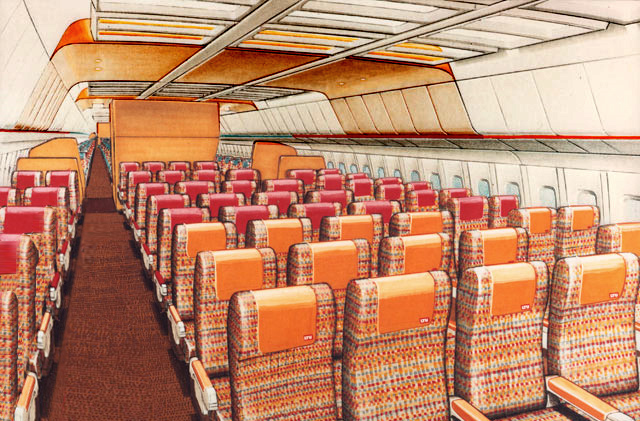
Interior design of a Lockheed L-1011.

After a careful evaluation of all available large-capacity aircraft, in October 1972 the choice fell on the Lockheed L.1011 Tristar. In May 1973 the first of five Tristars took off towards the Mediterranean basin. Due to the first "oil crisis", delivery of the second unit was delayed until autumn 1975. The capacious aircraft were able to continue serving all the mentioned destinations which had by now reached a higher level of tourist reception capacity. Furthermore, overseas destinations such as Los Angeles, Miami and New York in the USA, Nassau in the Bahamas, Cuba, Puerto Rico and Jamaica in the Caribbeans, Mexico, Venezuela, Brazil, Colombo (Sri Lanka), Maldives, Thailand, Kenya were reached for the first time. A total network of 36 destinations worldwide. In 1978, the passengers carried were almost 1.4 million with an average seat load factor of 77.5% and a large part of the clientele coming from North Rhine-Westphalia. In 1979 two the longer range L.1011 serie 500 were bought with delivery in the following year. LTU traditional red and white livery barely changed over the years, becoming a recognizable trademark in the German charter flight business.

In 1983, a subsidiary based in Munich, LTS, was founded. It had a similar livery, using blue instead of red. It was renamed LTU Süd in 1987 and got a new livery closer to LTU's red one. In 1998 it was dissolved and completely incorporated into LTU LTU also supervised associate companies in Spain (LTE, 1987-2001) and Austria (LTU Austria, 2004-2008).

The Tristar was a good workhorse during the 1980s but its life-time was approaching the end and LTU looked elsewhere for a worthy replacement, McDonnell Douglas and Airbus programs.

=== New horizons and new owners ===
The first new aircraft was the McDonnell Douglas MD-11, an updated evolution of the DC-10 of which four examples were ordered, the first being delivered in 1991. Five Airbus A330s series 300 were also ordered and the first one was delivered in 1994. In the meanwhile, in 1990, important changes had taken place. State-controlled WestLB bank took a 34% share, a necessary step to finance the acquisition of the new jetliners. At the same time LTU was granted scheduled traffic rights, which started in the month of May, and became a IATA member. On May 4, 1996, the L.1011 was bid farewell with a festive ceremony at Dusseldorf airport. From late 1996 until October 2000 LTU controlled RAS Fluggesellschaft engaged in freight transport with adapted Short 360s.

Anyway not all was well with the airline. The introduction of the computerized reservation system was labelled "disastrous" and booking figures fell. Changes in the top management brought incertainity for the staff and business partners. Because of other WestLB bank comitments in German travel industry its stake was put up for partial sale. After a period of unconfirmed speculations, the Swiss group SAir stepped forward and purchased 49.9% of the airline, effective 1 November 1998. The new management retired the MD.11s which were transferred to their subsidiary Swissair in 1998. Due to the reduction in the number of seats on board LTU concentrated on the markets of Florida, the Caribbean, the Maldives, Sri Lanka, Thailand. In order to maintain a position in the Mediterranean basin, some Boeing 737s were leased from other airlines and, in 1999, an Airbus A320 was purchased on leasing.

=== Purchase by Air Berlin and end of operations ===
By March 2007 the airline's owners were Intro Verwaltungsgesellschaft (55%) and Marbach Beteiligung und Consulting (45%) and had 2,892 employees. That month, Air Berlin bought LTU for €140 million in cash, creating the fourth-largest airline group in Europe in terms of traffic. Combined, the airlines carried 22.1 million passengers in 2006. The purchase was aimed at adding long-haul operations and increasing market share at Düsseldorf Airport. LTU initially retained its name on its leisure routes, while routes to the United States and China immediately switched to Air Berlin.

On 1 May 2007, LTU operated the first Arctic & North Pole sightseeing flight from continental Europe in aviation history, a charter flight for Deutsche Polarflug. The flight took 12h 55m and the aircraft, an A330-200 took 283 passengers from Düsseldorf via Norway, Svalbard, to The North Pole, eastern Greenland and Iceland back to Düsseldorf. The flight was filmed for an episode of PilotsEYE.tv.

In that same month, LTU presented its new livery. It maintained the traditional red and white corporate colors, but refreshed the overall appearance with smoother lines and overall more white. The new design was first applied to LTU's then new twelfth long-haul aircraft, an Airbus A330-200. This livery was later adapted to become the new Air Berlin image. LTU opened a third long-haul base at Berlin Tegel Airport in October 2007, basing a single Airbus A330-200 there to operate flights to Bangkok, Punta Cana and Varadero.

In 2008 Air Berlin announced that LTU name would no longer be used. All flights would be rebranded as Air Berlin. The last known flight under LTU callsign, but already in Air Berlin livery, was on 13 October 2009 from Montreal to Düsseldorf. As of April 2011, the LTU's AOC had expired and the company itself was dissolved.

== Fleet ==
During its existence, LTU operated the following aircraft types, including the fleet incorporated into Air Berlin by March 2007:

Aircraft type	Total	Introduced	Retired	Remarks
Airbus A320-200	12	1999	2009	Taken over by Air Berlin.
Airbus A321-200	4	2001	2009	Taken over by Air Berlin.
Airbus A330-200	8	2001	2009	Taken over by Air Berlin.
Airbus A330-300	7	1994	2009	Taken over by Air Berlin.
Boeing 747-200	1	1991	1991	Wet-leased from Evergreen International Airlines due to delayed delivery of first McDonnell Douglas MD-11.
Boeing 757-200	14	1984	2004	Operated with subsidiaries LTE and LTS.
Boeing 767-300ER	5	1989	2002	Operated with subsidiary LTS.
Bristol 170	1	1957	1961	
de Havilland DH.104 Dove	1	1957	1958	Another example still operating sightseeing flights in historic LTU livery.
Douglas DC-4	2	1958	1960	
Fokker F27 Friendship	5	1958	1974	Including two prototypes.
Fokker F28 Fellowship	5	1969	1974	Including two prototypes.
Lockheed L-1011-100	9	1973	1995	One was written off due to fire in 1991 during maintenance.
Lockheed L-1011-200	1	1986	1995	
Lockheed L-1011-500	3	1980	1996	LTU was the only German airline that operated the L-1011.
McDonnell Douglas MD-11	4	1991	1998	Transferred to Swissair.
Sud Aviation SE 210 Caravelle 10R	5	1967	1979	
Sud Aviation SE 210 Caravelle III	2	1965	1968	
Vickers VC.1 Viking	5	1955	1963	

== Gallery ==
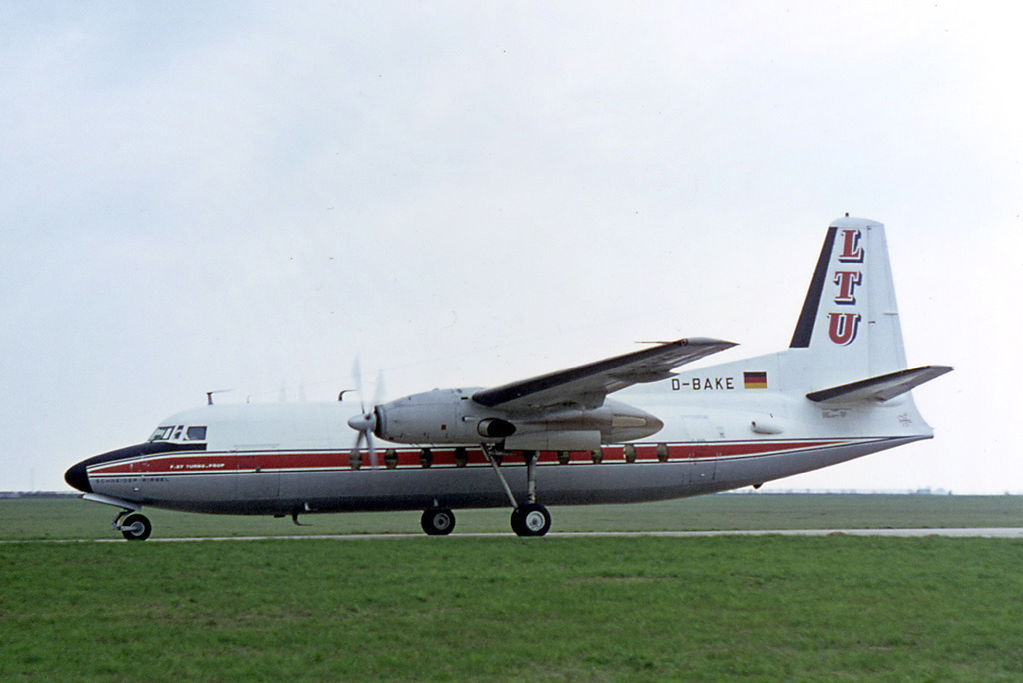
Fokker F 27-200 in 1964

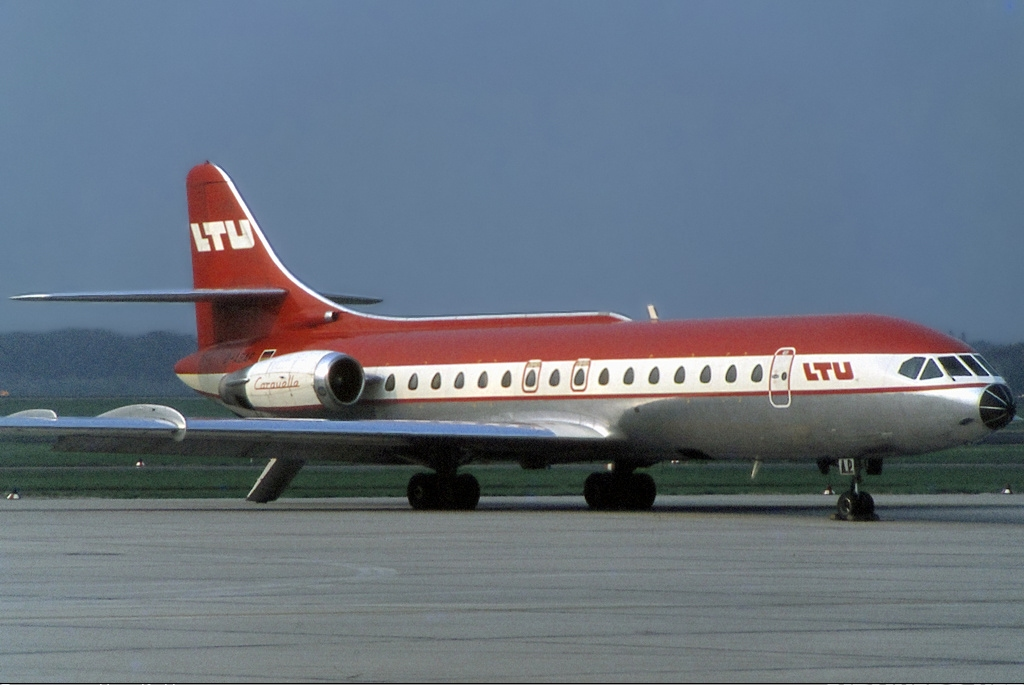
Sud Aviation SE-210 Caravelle serie 10B1R

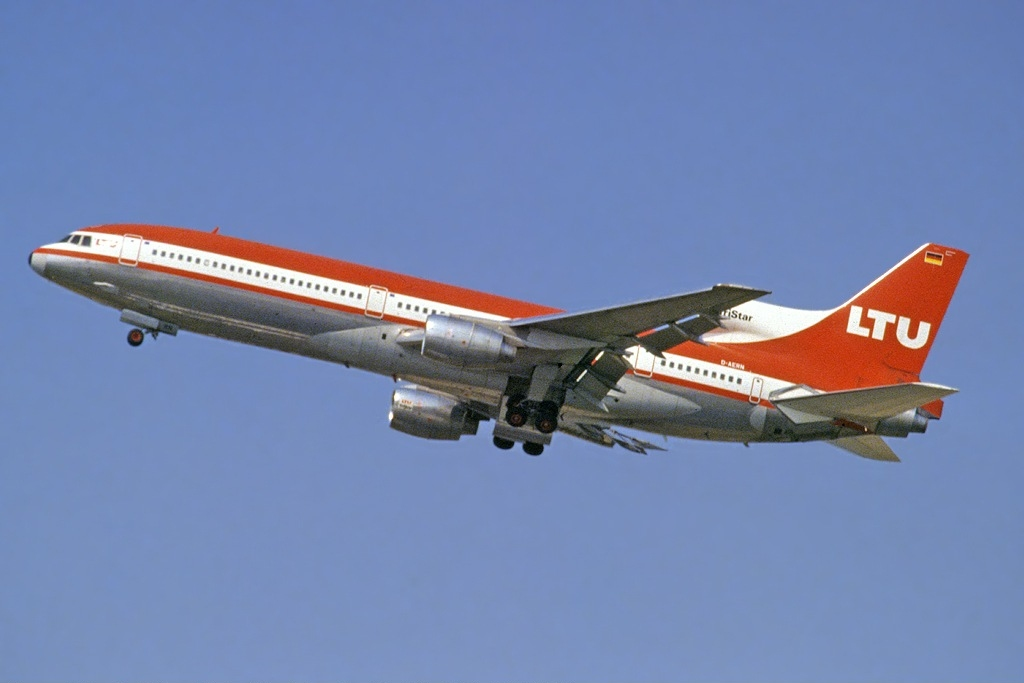
Lockheed L-1011-100 TriStar in typical "red roof" livery

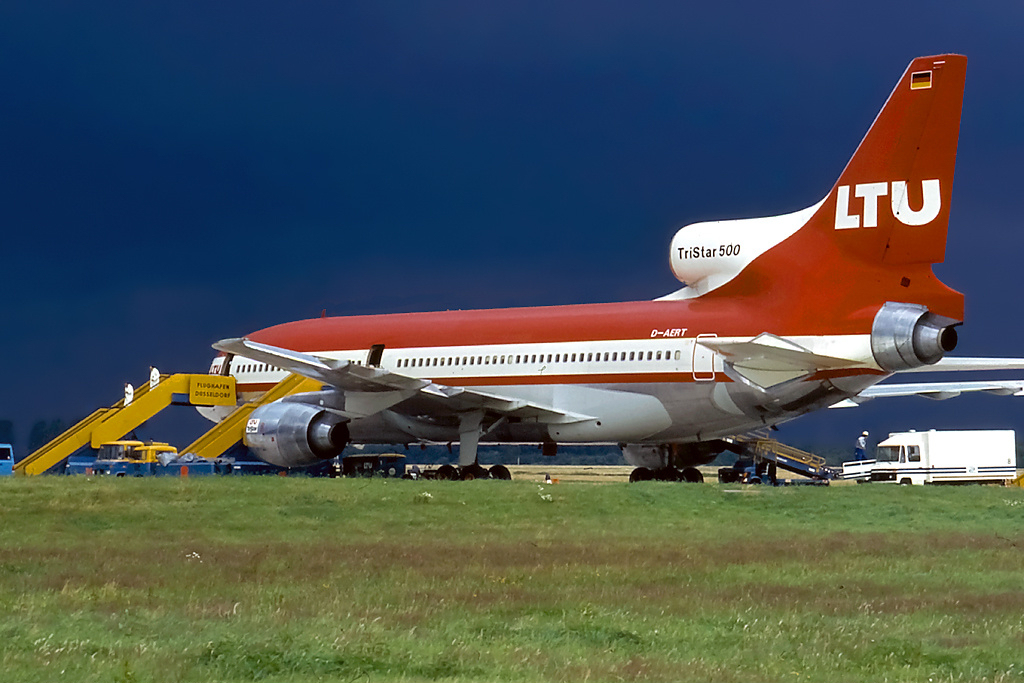
Lockheed L-1011-385-3 TriStar serie 500 at Düsseldorf airport

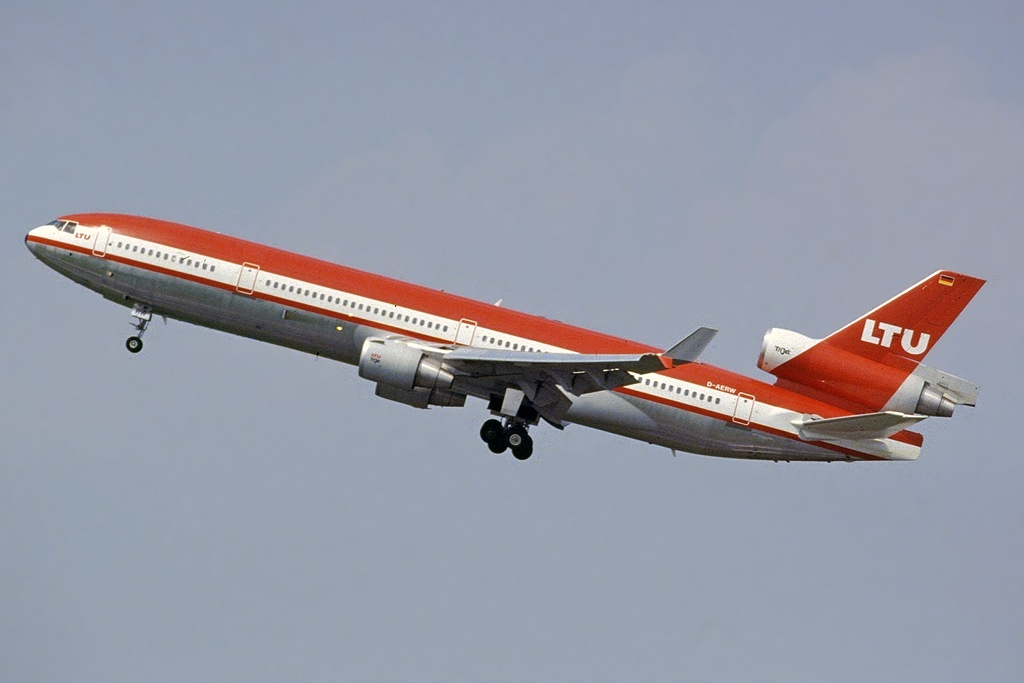
McDonnell Douglas MD-11

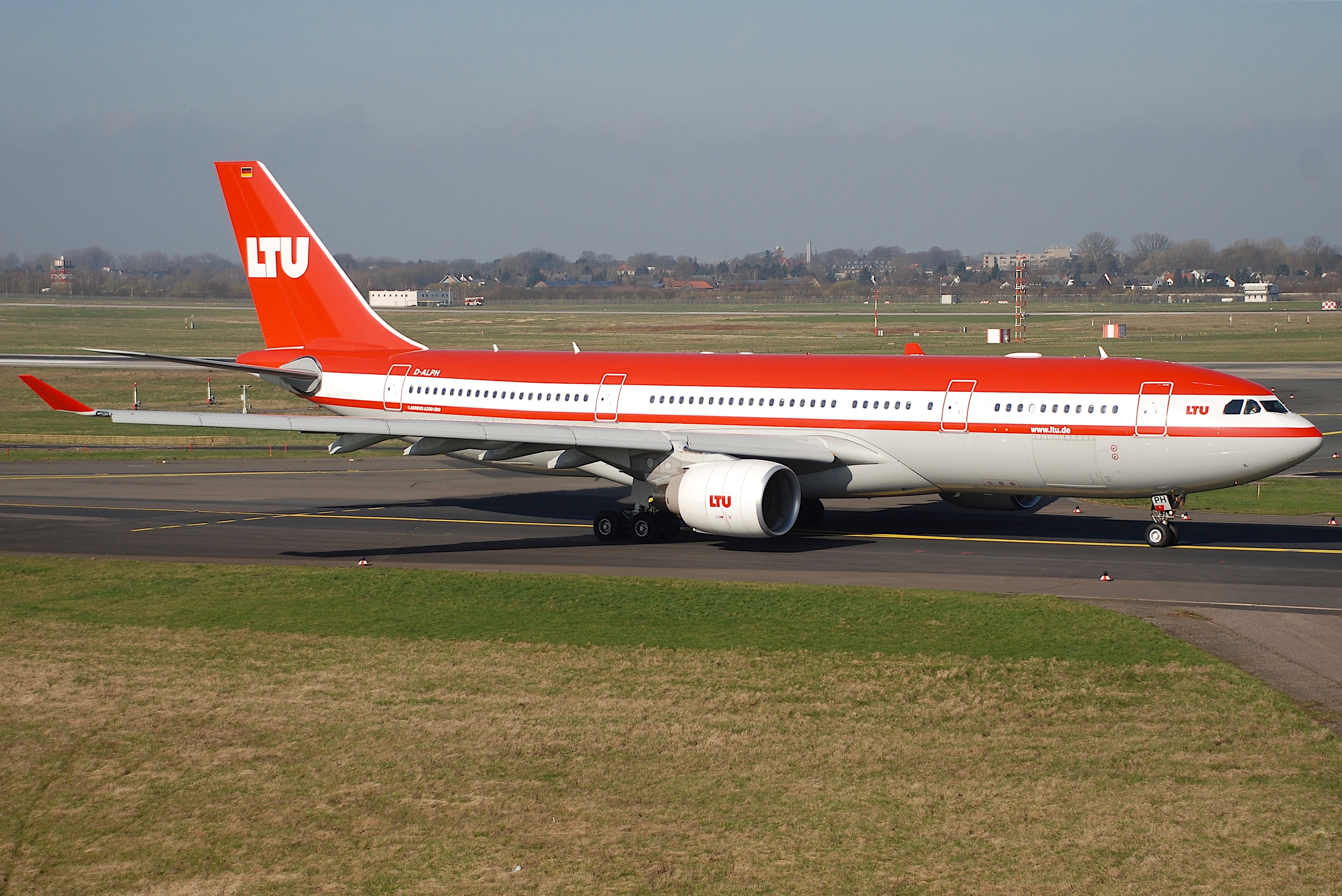
Airbus A330-200 in 2007

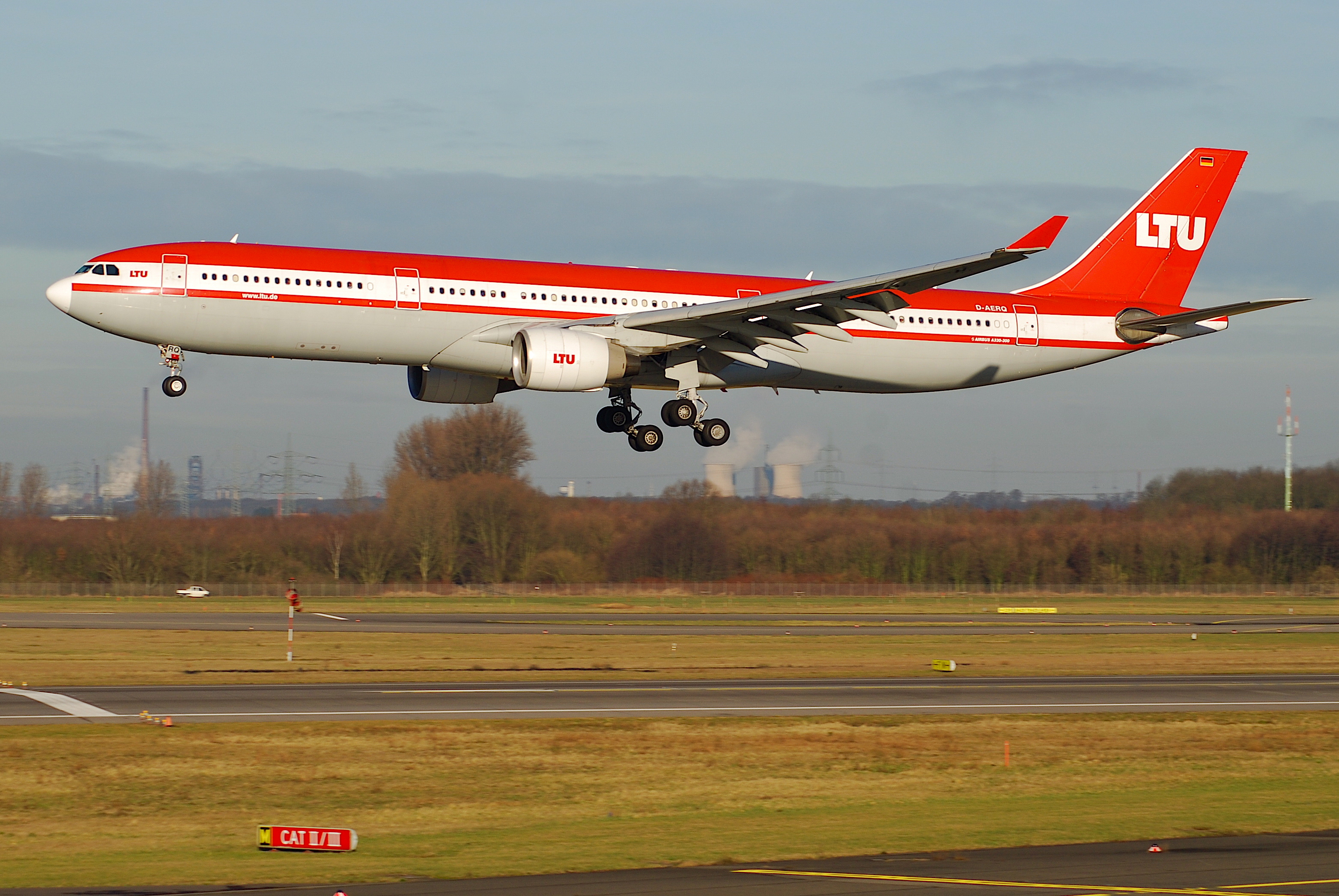
Airbus A330-300 in 2008

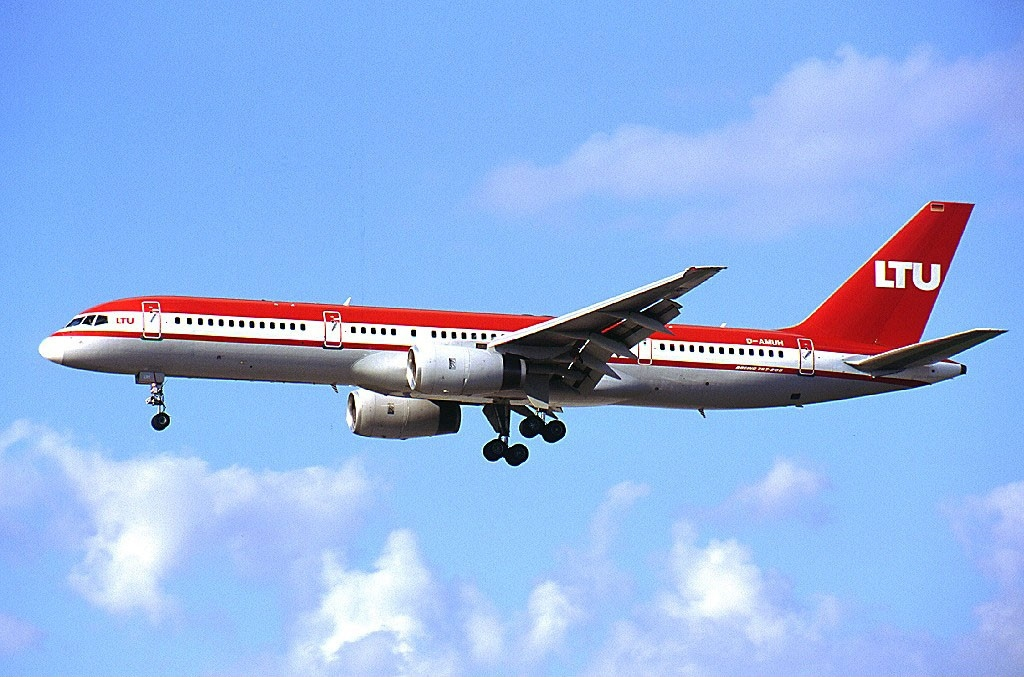
Boeing 757-200

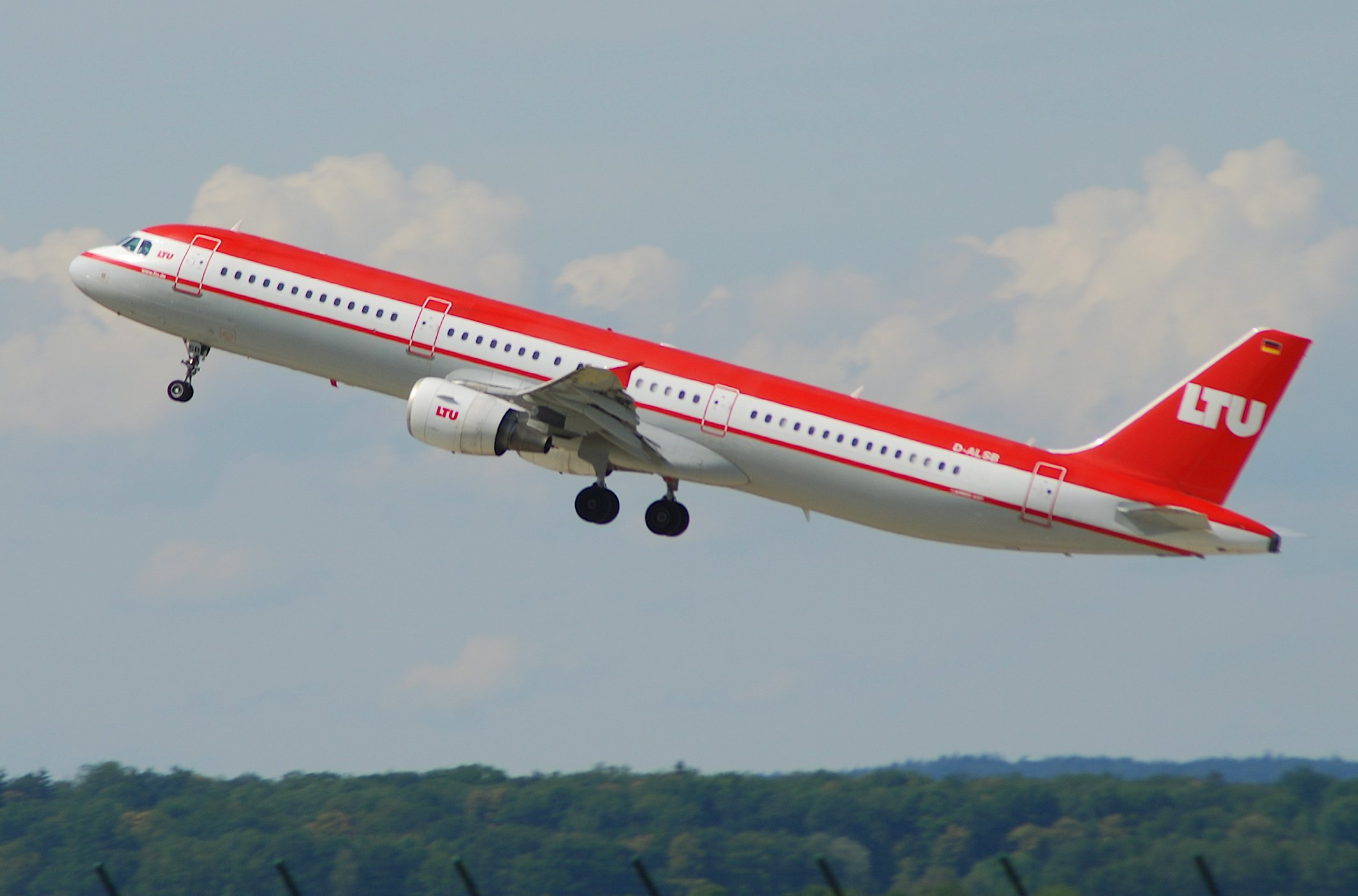
Airbus A321 in 2007

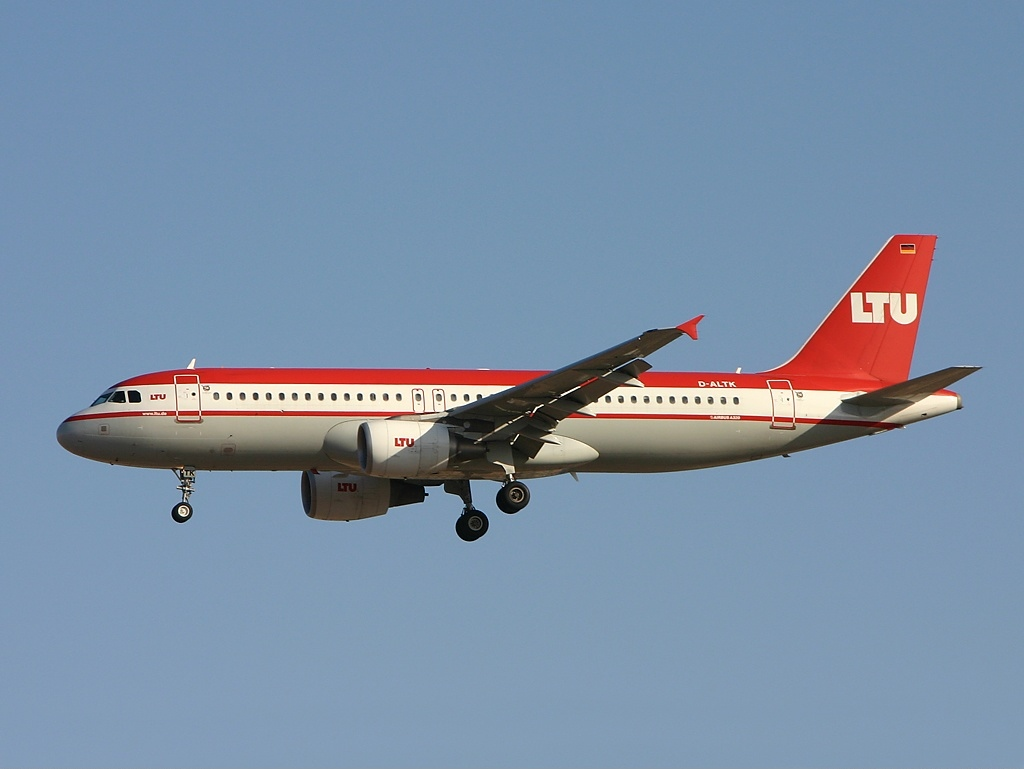
Airbus A320-214

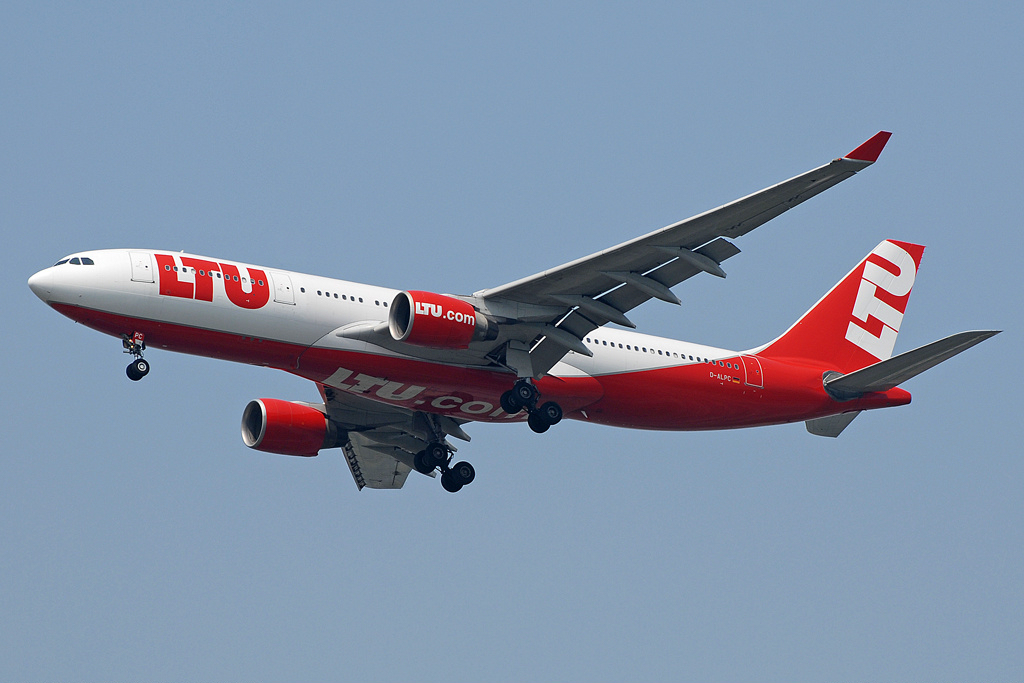
Airbus A330-200 in the short-lived new color scheme, which later was adapted by Air Berlin

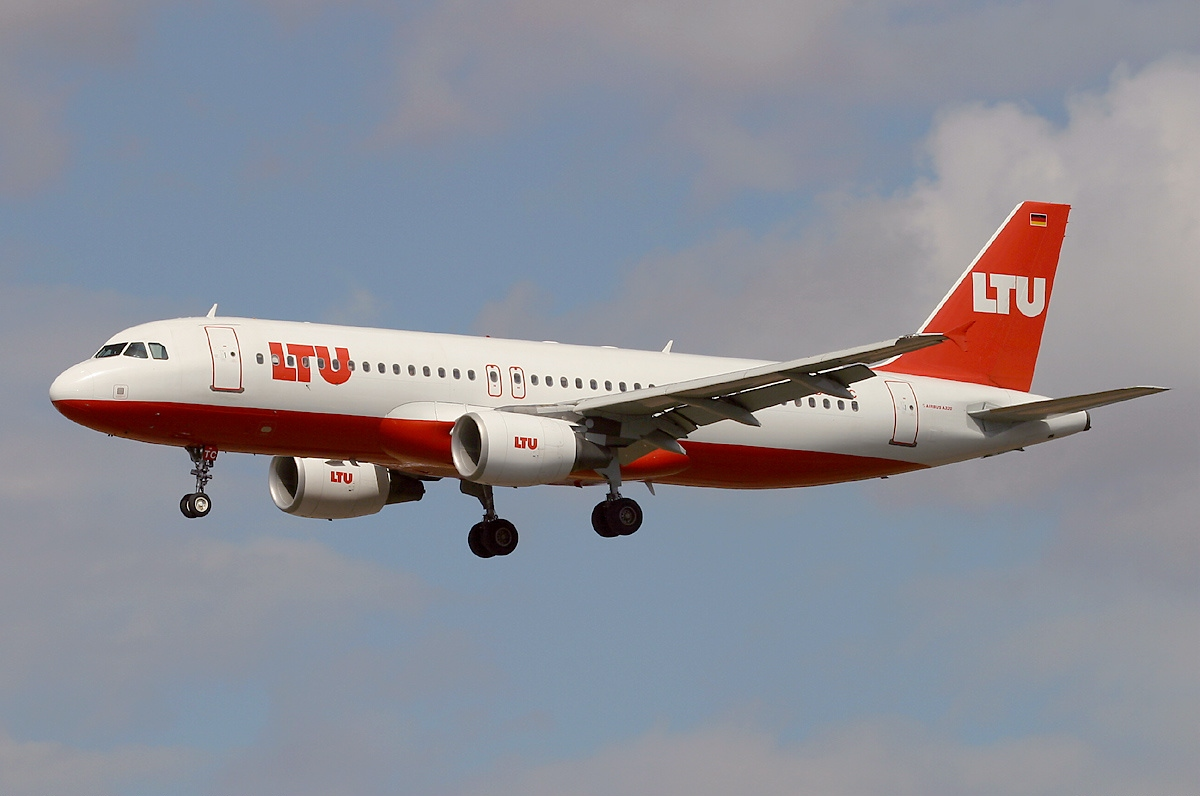
Airbus A320-214
