= LTU Austria =

Airline of Austria (2004–2008)

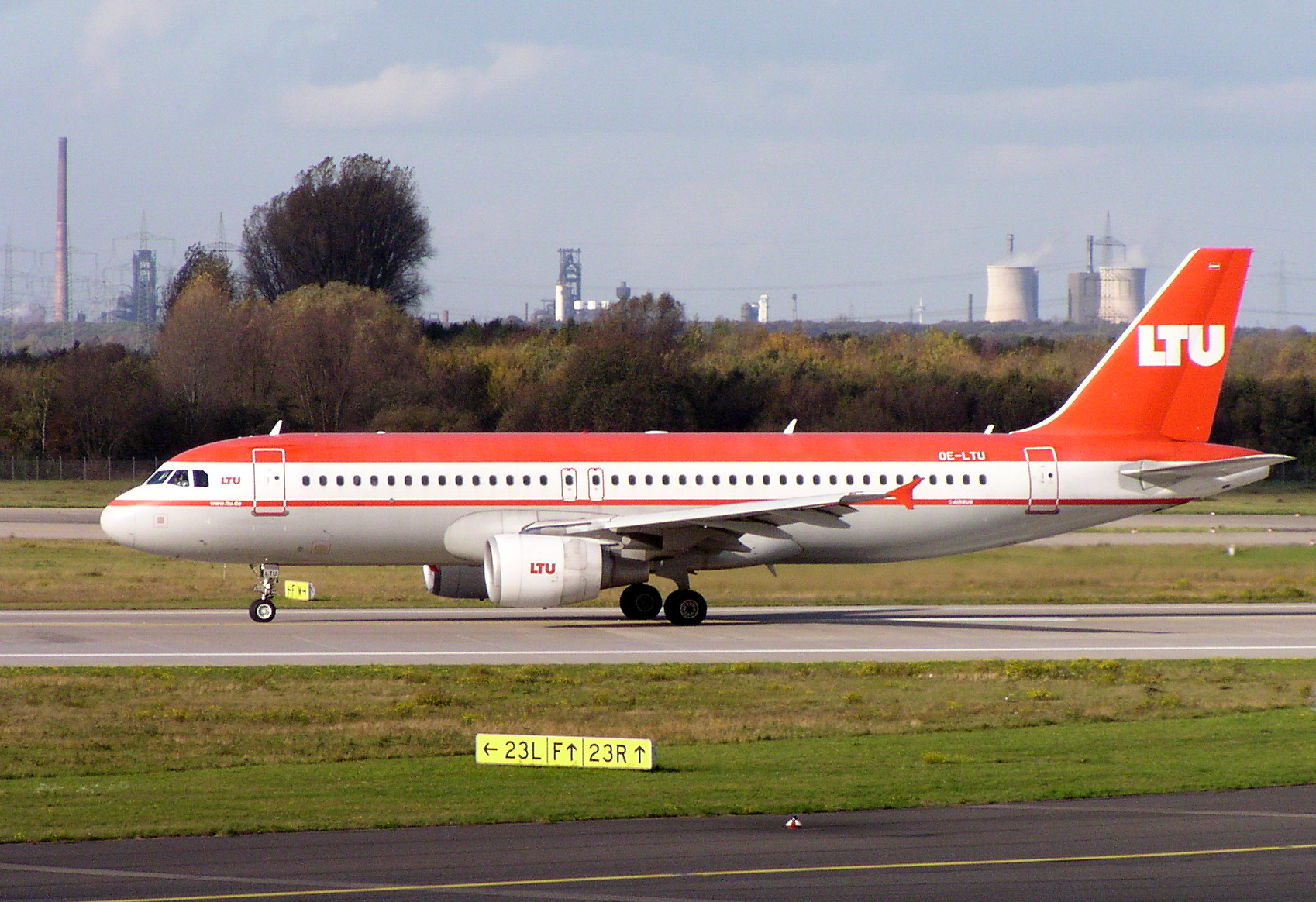
- Airbus A320-200
IATA	ICAO	Call sign
L3	LTO	BILLA TRANSPORT
- Founded: 2004
- Ceased operations: 2008
- Hubs: Vienna Airport
- Parent company: ITS-Billa; LTU International
- Headquarters: Vienna, Austria

LTU Austria, legally LTU Billa Lufttransport Unternehmen GmbH was an Austrian airline based in Vienna. It operated charter services to destinations in the Mediterranean and Red Sea areas. Its main operating base was Vienna Schwechat Airport.

== History ==
LTU Austria was established in April 2004 by Billa, parent company of Austrian tour operator ITS-BIlla. It obtained the air operators certificate on 1 April 2004. The livery was exactly the same of LTU airline from Germany. The airline ceased operations and transferred the only remaining Airbus A320-200 to LTU in 2008.

== Fleet ==
LTU Austria exclusively operated Airbus A320-200 jetliners. That registered OE-LTU was furnished with a full economy class, meanwhile OE-LTV had a 24 seat business class cabin alongside 144 economy class seats. Following the airline closure, the remaining aircraft in the fleet were transferred to Air Berlin.

LTU Austria historic fleet
Aircraft type	Registration	Delivered	Left	Aircraft fate
Airbus A320-200	OE-LTU	April 2004	April 2008	Air Berlin (as D-ALTE)
Airbus A320-200	OE-LTV	April 2005	May 2006	LTU (as D-ALTF)
