= TWI =

Twi is a collection of dialects of the Akan language, spoken in Ghana.

TWI or Twi may also refer to:

- Twi-, a numerical prefix

== As an acronym ==
- Tailwind Airlines (ICAO code), Turkish charter airline
- Tolerable weekly intake, an estimate of the amount of a harmful substance that can be safely ingested
- The Way International, a religious organization considered by some to be a cult
- The Welding Institute, a research and technology organisation based in the UK
- Tin Wing stop (MTR station code), a Light Rail stop in Hong Kong
- Topographic Wetness Index, an algorithm based on slope and flow accumulation
- Trade weighted index, an economic instrument used to compare exchange rates
- Training Within Industry, a service in the US that provided consultancy to war-related industries during World War II
- Trans World International, a distributor and producer of televised sports
- Tread Wear Indicator, a safety indicator on vehicle tyres (tires) shown in the Tire code
- Twickenham railway station (National Rail station code), a railway station in London
- Two-wire interface, a variant of I²C
- Two-way immersion, a form of dual language education

== See also ==
- TWL (disambiguation)
- TW1 (disambiguation)
