= Western Telematic, Inc. =

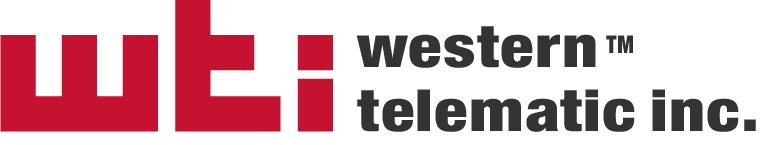

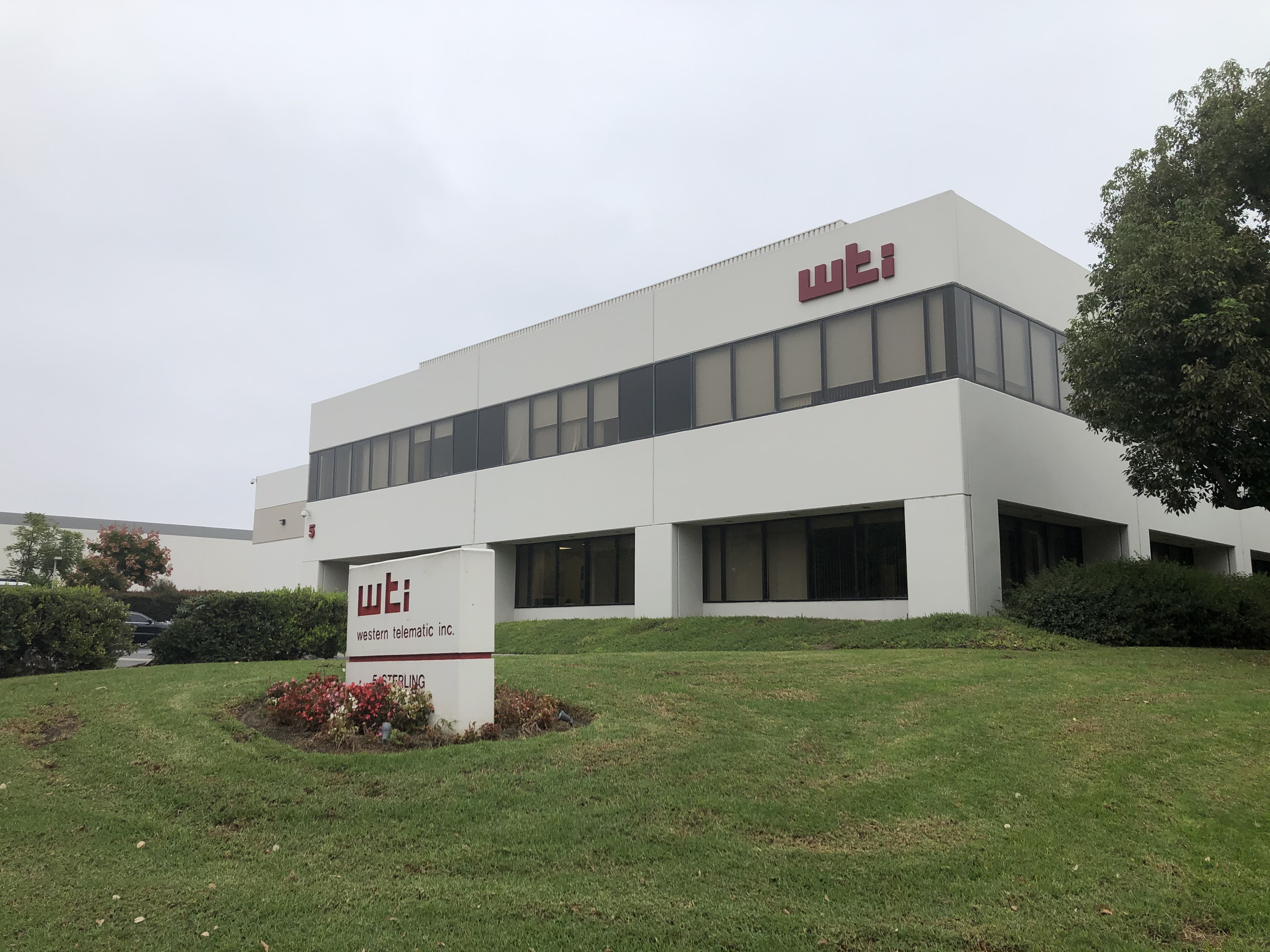
- Founded: 1964; 62 years ago in Arcadia, California
- Founders: Irving Ross; David Morrison; Herbert "Pete" Hoover III
- Headquarters: Irvine, California, United States
- Website: www.wti.com

Western Telematic, Inc., commonly known as WTI, is an American networking equipment manufacturer based in Irvine, California.

== History ==
Western Telematic, Inc. was founded in 1964 in Arcadia, California, by Irving Ross, David Morrison, and Herbert "Pete" Hoover III. In 1968, WTI worked with IBM to design and build a four-channel communications device for the IBM 1130. It resulted in the development of TM150 that allowed multiple remote terminals to connect to a single computer.

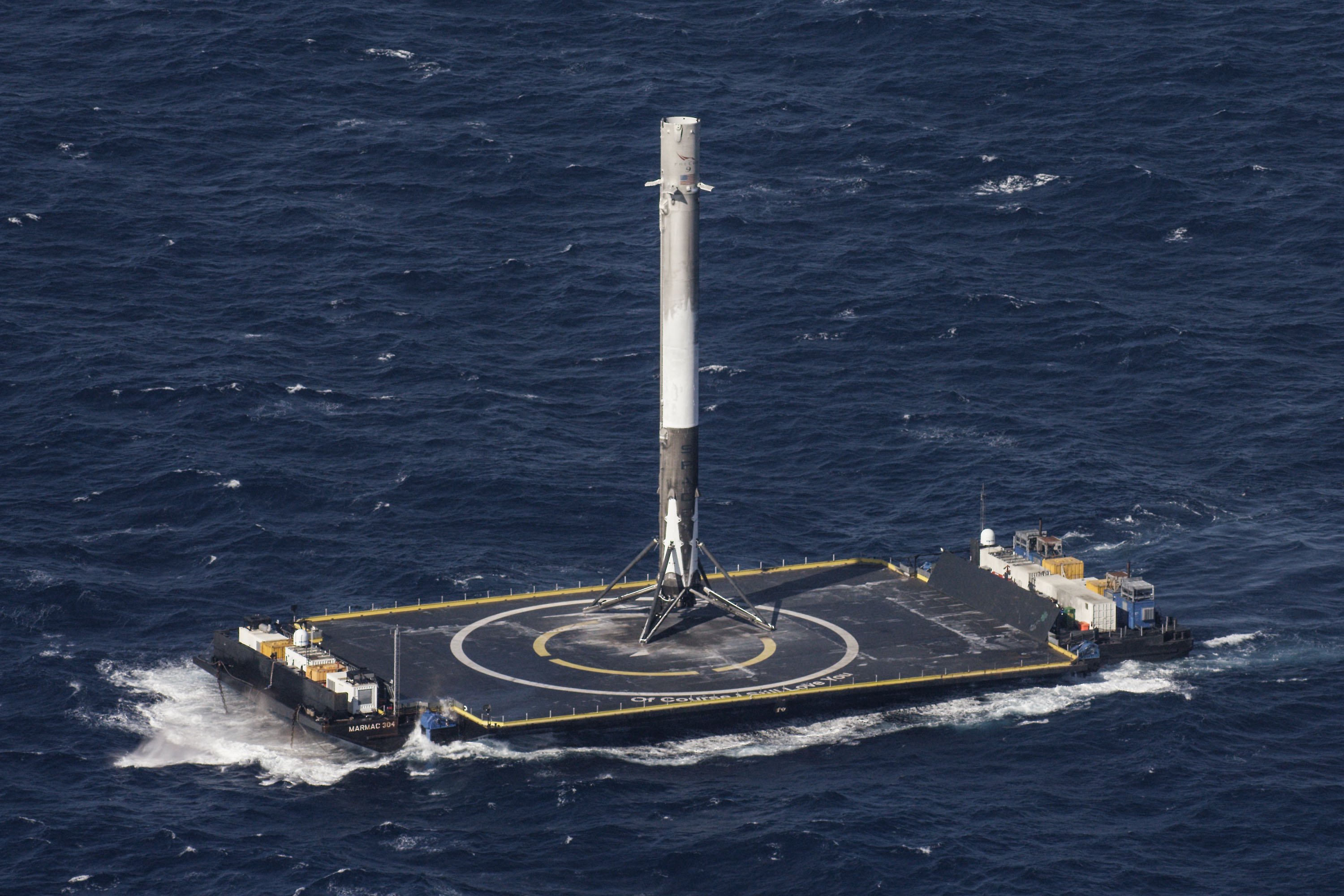
Western Telematic assisted SpaceX with the control mission critical infrastructure on the autonomous in 2016.

In 1974, WTI developed a device for the Federal Bureau of Investigation (FBI) to convert magnetic card typewriter data into teletype code and punched tape. David Morrison became president in 1975 and served until his retirement in 2008.

In 1984, WTI introduced a console server that allowed remote access to multiple RS-232.

In 1987, WTI relocated to a 25,000-square-foot facility in Irvine, where it released the Lasernet device for printer-sharing. In the early 1990s, WTI partnered with Sprint Communications to fight phone fraud with its Pollcat II+, an enhancement to its call accounting system for PBX setups. Pollcat II+ was designed to detect unauthorized long-distance calls by analyzing call records, generating alerts, and enabling remote network management responses such as sending alerts to pagers or local consoles.

In 2018, David Morrison died in a plane crash near Jean, Nevada.

=== Recent developments ===
In 2010, WTI was selected by Cisco Systems as a featured vendor at the Cisco Live exposition, where it showcased its secure remote management tools. That same year, WTI released the RSM-8R8 series, a hybrid device that combined a console switch, remote reboot functionality, and automatic transfer switch in a 1U form factor.

In 2016, Western Telematic provided remote management technology to SpaceX for use in the Falcon 9 autonomous spaceport drone ships. The following year, the company introduced the first remote power distribution unit featuring an internal 4G LTE modem and an AC-powered control relay switch.

In 2019, WTI incorporated automation into its out-of-band management solutions by integrating with DevOps tools and telemetry-based network automation platforms.

== Products ==
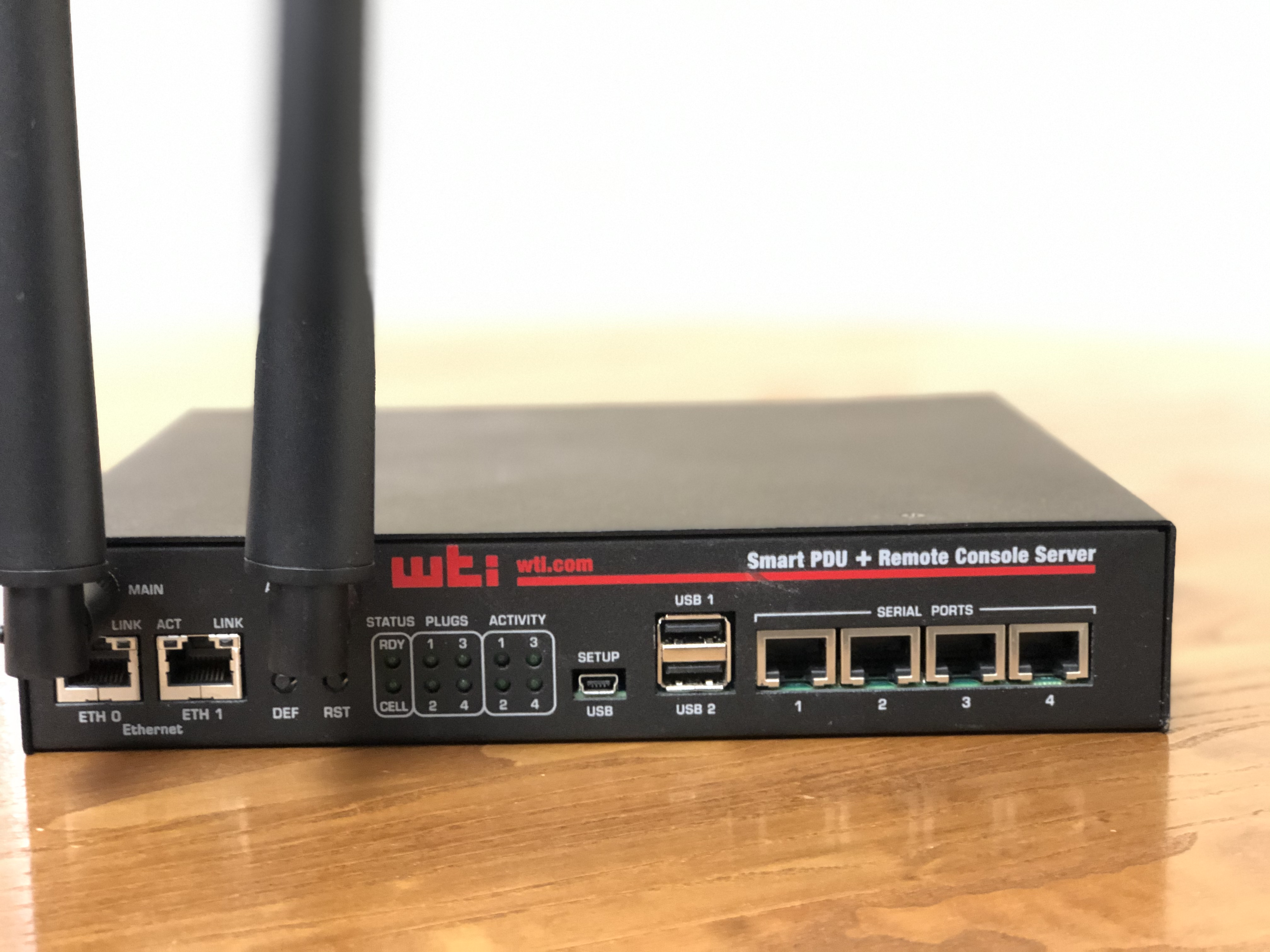
Smart PDU and remote console server combo product of WTI.

Western Telematic, Inc. has developed a variety of hardware for network management and connectivity, including serial console servers, power distribution units (PDUs), A/B fallback switches, and automatic transfer switches. These products are typically used for remote access, power control, and environmental monitoring in data centers and distributed IT environments.

During the 1980s and 1990s, the company released a range of hardware products aimed at addressing telecommunications, printer sharing, and port management requirements.

The PSU-81B was a printer-sharing device capable of sequentially scanning up to eight RS-232 input ports to detect activity and forward data to a connected printer. The unit, which the company launched in April 1987, featured a microprocessor-based design with configurable settings for baud rate, parity, and handshake protocol. It operated with only one active port at a time, switching based on a user-defined interval.

The company introduced the Call Power switch in February 1986. This device enabled the remote or scheduled shutdown of computer systems via modem commands and included integrated surge protection along with a manual bypass switch for on-site control.

The SS-16 was introduced in December 1984 as a 16-port RS-232 smart switch. It allowed users to configure each port independently and supported local port-to-port networking. The system could manage up to eight simultaneous connections and featured menu-driven control for selecting and managing ports.

In July 1986, Western Telematic introduced the RAB-14 switching system, which supported up to 196 A/B switches within a modular chassis. It was used for electronically switching RS-232 lines between computer systems or modems, with each module managing multiple connections through a central power and control rack.

The TAS-41, launched in October 1985, enabled up to four users to share a single RS-232 port. It featured user-specific command-based access, configurable session timeouts, and support for adjustable data transmission rates.

Western Telematic’s DB-1 was introduced earlier, in January 1984, as a data booster for RS-232 lines. It acted as a line conditioner that filtered noise, enhanced signal integrity, and retransmitted signals to extend communication distance over serial cable runs.

In the 1990s, the company released the Pollcat II+, a call accounting system designed to detect and report unauthorized long-distance telephone activity in PBX systems. The device offered fraud detection features and supported integration with external monitoring and alerting tools. It was developed in cooperation with Sprint Communications.
