= LTE International Airways =

Charter airline of Spain (1987–2008)

Lte International Airways
| IATA | ICAO | Call sign |
|---|---|---|
| XO | LTE | FUN JET |
- Founded: 29 April 1987
- Commenced operations: 1 November 1987
- Ceased operations: 15 November 2008
- Operating bases: Barcelona; Fuerteventura; Gran Canaria; Lanzarote; Palma de Mallorca; Tenerife–South
- Parent company: LTU International (1987–2001); Globalia
- Headquarters: Palma de Mallorca, Spain

Lte International Airways S.A. (Lte Volar Airlines) was a Spanish charter airline based in Palma de Mallorca, Spain. It operated passenger charter services throughout Europe. Its main base was Son Sant Joan Airport, Palma de Mallorca with hubs at Tenerife South Airport, Gran Canaria Airport, Lanzarote Airport, Fuerteventura Airport and Josep Tarradellas Barcelona–El Prat Airport.

== History ==
The airline was established on 29 April 1987 by Spanish businessmen and German LTU International. It started operations on 1 November 1987.

From 1993 until May 2001, LTU was the sole owner having bought out the other original shareholders. On 24 May 2001, LTU sold the airline to a group of Spanish and Italian businessmen, including the Volare Group. As a result, LTE was rebranded Volar Airlines for two successive years 2003 and 2004.

In 2005, the airline was renamed back to LTE International Airways. The airline was wholly owned by Gasarer.

From July 2008, Lte operated flights between Norwich (UK) and Barcelona, Alicante and Palma de Mallorca, and from Winter 2008-2009 it hoped to fly from Norwich to Tenerife, Las Palmas and Málaga.

On 16 October 2008, Lte abruptly announced that it was suspending all flights -both regular and charter- due to the financial situation of the company, which made it difficult to meet the next few days' operational expenses. Only the three aircraft operating for other airlines will be kept pending further decisions. It has subsequently announced a resumption of charter operations from 27 October 2008.

On 27 October 2008, Lte announced on their web site they had resumed their charter activities and expected to re-open the on-line bookings, with no other details. It had continued limited ACMI operations on behalf of other carriers until 15 November 2008 when it finally suspended all operations.

== Destinations ==
LTE served the following destinations (at Summer 2008):

- France
  - Toulouse - Toulouse-Blagnac Airport
- Germany
  - Düsseldorf - Düsseldorf Airport
  - Frankfurt - Frankfurt Airport
  - Hamburg - Hamburg Airport
- Poland
  - Warsaw - Warsaw Frédéric Chopin Airport
- Portugal
  - Faro - Faro Airport
- Cape Verde with TACV
  - Sal - Amílcar Cabral International Airport
  - Santiago - Praia International Airport
  - Boa Vista - Boa Vista Airport
- Spain
  - Alicante - Alicante–Elche Miguel Hernández Airport
  - Barcelona - Josep Tarradellas Barcelona–El Prat Airport (Base)
  - Las Palmas - Gando Airport (Base)
  - Tenerife - Tenerife South Airport (Base)
  - Málaga
  - Lanzarote - Arrecife Airport (Base)
  - Palma de Mallorca - Son Sant Joan Airport (Main Base)
- United Kingdom
  - Norwich - Norwich International Airport
  - Prestwick
- Morocco
  - Agadir
- Saudi Arabia
  - Riyadh - King Khalid International Airport

== Fleet ==
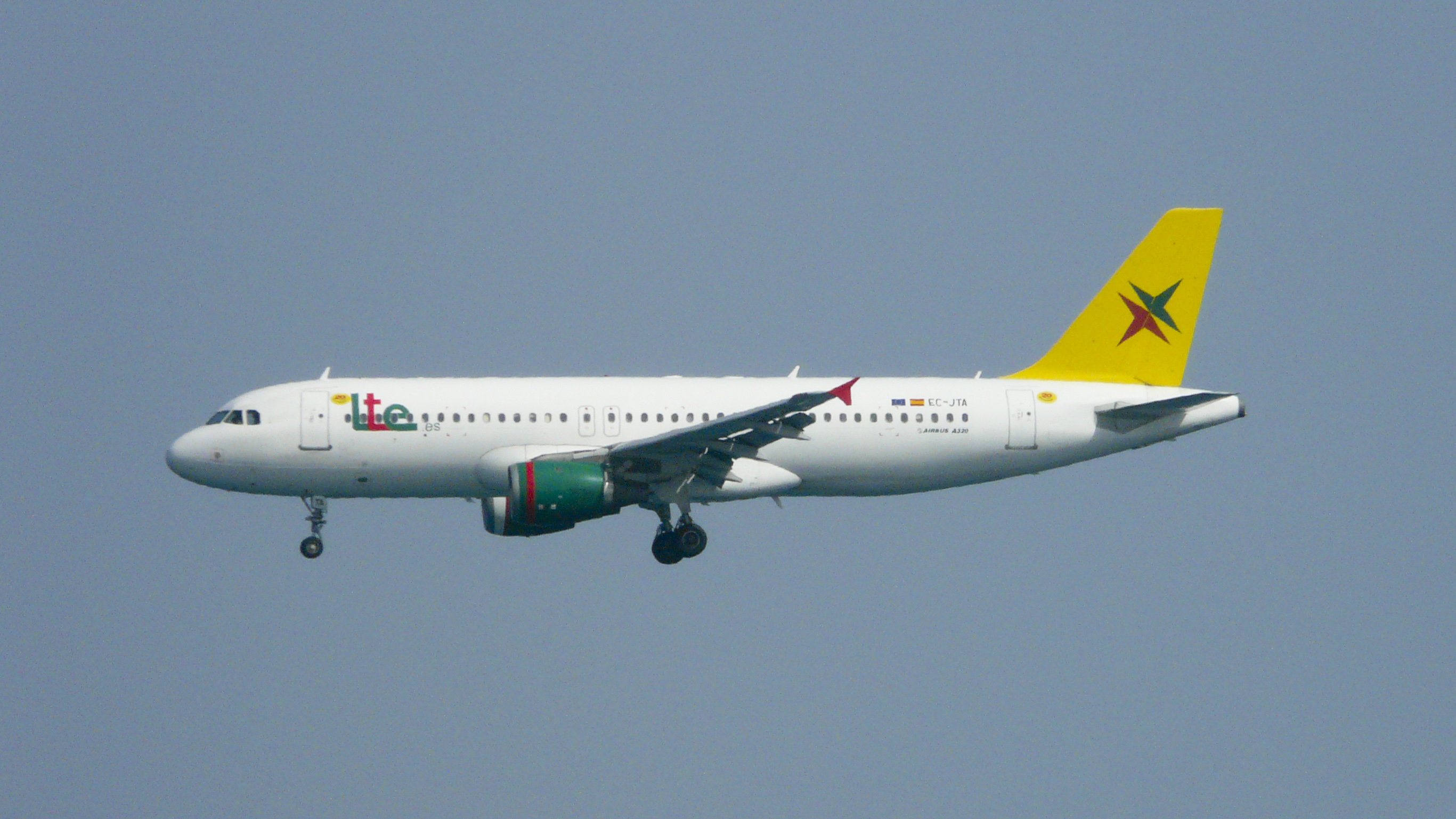
LTE Airbus A320-200

The Lte International Airways fleet consisted of the following aircraft (at 7 November 2008):

| Aircraft | Total | Notes |
|---|---|---|
| Airbus A320-200 | 3 | 1 operated for Nouvelair |
| Boeing 757-200 | 6 | |
| Total | 3 | |

== Accidents ==
On 18 May 2005, a Jordanian Airbus A320, registration JY-JAR operating for LTE suffered a braking malfunction on landing at Leeds Bradford Airport in the UK following a flight from Fuerteventura Airport. The aircraft touched down on runway 14 just beyond the touchdown zone, approximately 400 m (1,300 ft) beyond the aiming point. The pilots determined that the rate of deceleration was inadequate and applied full reverse thrust and full manual braking in an effort to stop the aircraft, however the normal braking system malfunctioned and the Captain turned the aircraft onto a level grassed area to the right of the runway where it came to rest. There were no injuries to the passengers or crew, however the Air Accidents Investigation Branch made seven safety recommendations in the final accident report.
