= Lebanese Air Transport =

Ground Handling Company

Lebanese Air Transport (CHARTER) CO. S.A.L
IATA	ICAO	Call sign
LQ	LAQ	LAT
- Founded: 1958; 68 years ago
- Hubs: Beirut
- Secondary hubs: Beirut Int'l Airport
- Focus cities: None
- Frequent-flyer program: None
- Fleet size: None
- Destinations: None
- Parent company: Asyad Holding Group KSA and a KSA PEP.
- Headquarters: Rafic Hariri International Airport, Lebanon
- Key people: Mr. Mohammed Daaboul (Chairman) Mr. Daniel Tarrega (Chief Executive Officer) Mr. Walid Kanaan (Ground Operations Director) Ms. Carmen Ghazal (Finance Director) Ms. Maya Bdeir (Hospitality Director)
- Employees: 499
- Website: http://www.lat.com.lb/

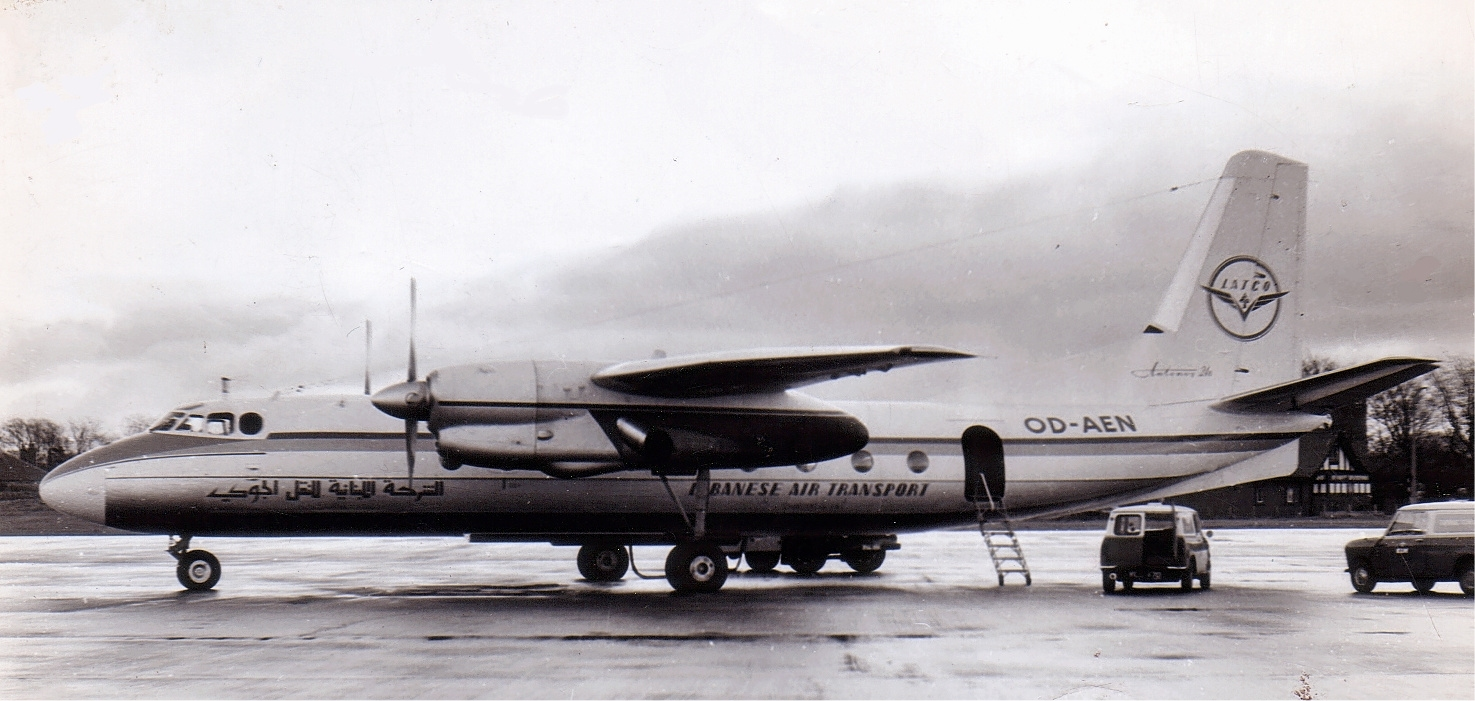
Lebanese Air Transport Antonov An-24B at Prestwick Airport in the 1960s.

Lebanese Air Transport (Charter) s.a.l. is a Ground Handling Company based in Beirut, Lebanon.
