= IWT =

IWT may refer to:

- Ifor Williams Trailers, a manufacturer of trailers up to 3500kg
- Indus Waters Treaty, a water-sharing treaty between India and Pakistan
- Institute for the promotion of Innovation by Science and Technology, in Flanders, Belgium
- Illegal wildlife trade
