= WLT =

WLT may refer to:

== Land trusts ==
- World Land Trust
- Wildlife Land Trust Australia
- Humane Society Wildlife Land Trust

== Other uses ==
- Astro Wah Lai Toi, a Malaysian video pay channel
- Wallington railway station, National Rail code WLT
- Welsh Terrier, Canadian Kennel Club breed code WLT
- West London Tram
- WLT: A Radio Romance, a 1991 novel by Garrison Keillor
- World Literature Today, an American literary magazine
- Writers' League of Texas

== See also ==
- WTL (disambiguation)
