= TLW =

TLW may refer to:

- Talasea Airport, airport serving Talasea, Papua New guinea (IATA code: TLW)
- Tandliawala railway station, Pakistan (station code: TLW)
- Tavern League of Wisconsin, American trade association
- Teamline Air, defunct Austrian airline (ICAO airline code: TLW)
- Thang Long Warriors, Vitenamese basketball team
- The Light Within, a social networking platform for women in Ambala, India. See Chitra Sarwara § The Light Within
- Tom L. Ward, American businessman
- Tullow Oil, a multinational oil and gas company
- True Love Waits (organization), promoting sexual abstinence until marriage
- Tyseley Locomotive Works, railway museum in England
- Wemale language, an Austronesian language spoken on western Seram Island in Indonesia (ISO 639-3 code: tlw)

== See also ==
- The Lost World (disambiguation)
- True Love Waits (disambiguation)
