= Luxor Air =

IATA	ICAO	Call sign
–	LXO	–
- Founded: 1999
- Ceased operations: 2008
- Fleet size: –
- Headquarters: Cairo, Egypt
- Key people: Mohamed Fekry Ali (COO)

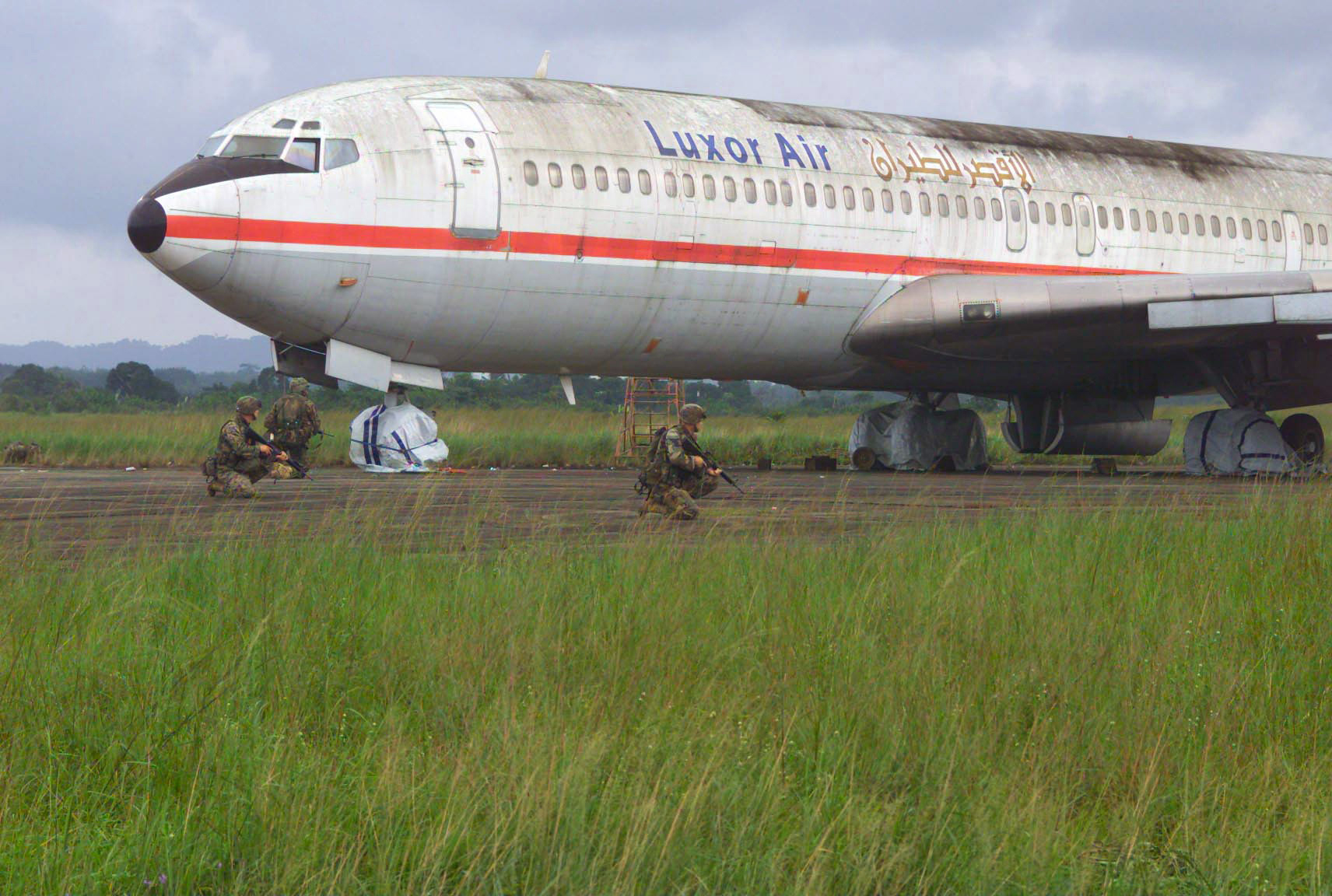
Derelict plane at Roberts International Airport in Liberia (2003)

Luxor Air was a charter airline based in Cairo, Egypt. It was privately owned and operated charter flights mainly to Europe. Its main base was Cairo International Airport.

== History ==
Luxor Air was founded in 1997 in Cairo by private investors. In July 1998, the company acquired a Boeing 707-300C from Middle East Airlines, with which it commenced operations. The aircraft was primarily used for ad hoc charter services within Egypt, as well as for international Hajj flights to and from Jeddah (Saudi Arabia). In July 2000, Luxor Air added a second aircraft, a leased Boeing 737-400, which it operated under an ACMI agreement for the Algerian airline Ecoair International. After the Boeing 707 had to be written off as a total loss following an accident on 23 March 2001 (see below), the company temporarily ceased all operations.

Operations resumed in August 2002 with a leased McDonnell Douglas MD-83. Luxor Air then focused mainly on operating IT charter flights to and from Europe. In July 2003, it added a second leased aircraft of the same type. In March 2004, France banned the airline from entering its airspace after an MD-83 deviated from its landing approach during a nighttime approach to Nantes and flew over the city center at an altitude of approximately 150 metres (500 feet). Following this incident, the company came under scrutiny from European aviation authorities. One month later, safety deficiencies were identified during an inspection of one of its aircraft at Amsterdam-Schiphol, prompting the Netherlands, Belgium, Italy and Switzerland to also impose flight bans. Luxor Air subsequently returned one MD-83 to the lessor and continued operations with only one aircraft. After the bans were lifted, it resumed IT charter services to those countries the following year. In 2008, the company ceased operations.
