= TWL =

TWL may refer to:

- Thermal work limit, a heat index to prevent heat stress
- Titagarh Wagons Limited, railway wagon manufacturer from India
- Tournament Word List (officially NASPA Word List), the official word list for English Scrabble in North America, published by NASPA Games
- Transepidermal water loss, water loss across epidermis
- The Women's Library, Sydney, Australia
- That Wikipedia List, a YouTube miniseries
- The Weakest Link, a British game show
- The Wikipedia Library, a repository of academic sources freely available to Wikipedia editors
- Twilight, the codename for the Nintendo DSi

== See also ==
- TWI (disambiguation)
- TW1 (disambiguation)
