= TA =

TA or ta may refer to:

== Places ==
- Ta (island), Federated States of Micronesia
- Ta, Chiang Rai, Thailand
- Ta, Iran, Kordestan village
- Ta River, Virginia, US
- Province of Taranto, Italy
- Tel Aviv, Israel

== People with the name ==
- Tạ, a Vietnamese surname (including a list of persons with the name)
- T.A. All Day, an American rapper

== Arts, entertainment and media ==
=== Gaming ===
- Total Annihilation, a 1997 real-time strategy game
- TrueAchievements, a website to track Xbox player achievements

=== Music ===
- TA (album), 2002 album by the post-rock band Trans Am
- Ta, name of a note in the solfège scale

=== Newspapers ===
- Tages-Anzeiger, of Switzerland
- Telemarksavisa, of Norway
- Thüringer Allgemeine, of Germany

=== Other uses in arts and media ===
- TextAmerica, a moblog community photo website
- Third Age, a time period in J. R. R. Tolkien's Middle-earth
- TA3 (TV channel, 1991–1992), a defunct Slovak television channel

== Business, finance and law ==
- TA Luft, a German air pollution regulation
- Technical analysis, method to forecast pricing from trading history
- Trading as, a term denoting a business using a name other than its legal owner

== Education ==
- Teaching assistant, someone who aids an educator with class instruction
  - Paraprofessional educator, a qualified, paid assistant of compulsory-age pupils
    - Teaching assistant (United Kingdom)

== Language ==
- Ta (cuneiform), a cuneiform sign
- Ta (Indic), a consonant in Brahmic writing systems
- Ṭa (Indic), another consonant in Brahmic scripts
- Ta (Javanese) (ꦠ), a letter of the Javanese script
- Ta (kana), the た or タ kana of Japanese
- Tāʾ ت or ṭāʾ ط, an Arabic letter
- Tamil language, spoken in South Asia (ISO 639-1:ta)
- TA, a gender-neutral third person pronoun in Chinese written as Latin script "TA".

== Organizations ==
=== Companies ===
- TA Associates, a private equity firm based in Boston
- TACA Airlines, an international airline headquartered in San Salvador, El Salvador (IATA code TA)
- Travelcenters of America, a North American truck stop chain
- Triumph-Adler, a German office equipment manufacturer

=== Military ===
- Territorial Army (India), an Army Reserve
- Territorial Army (United Kingdom), now Army Reserve

=== Schools ===
- Takoma Academy, a private school in Takoma Park, Maryland, United States
- Talmudical Academy of Baltimore
- Thayer Academy, a private school in Braintree, Massachusetts, United States
- Tuscaloosa Academy, a private school in Tuscaloosa, Alabama, United States

=== Other organizations ===
- Telluride Association, an American non-profit for education programs
- Tennis Australia, an Australian sports governing body
- Transportation Alternatives, an advocacy NGO based in New York City
- Team Ayu, the official fan club of Japanese singer-songwriter Ayumi Hamasaki

== Science and technology ==
=== Biology, medicine and psychology ===
- Takayasu's arteritis
- Terminologia Anatomica, an international standard for human anatomical nomenclature
- Tibialis anterior muscle
- Transactional analysis, a psychoanalytic theory of psychology developed by psychiatrist Eric Berne during the late 1950s
- Transversus abdominis muscle

=== Physics and chemistry ===
- Tantalum, symbol Ta, a chemical element
- Teraampere, a multiple of the SI unit of electric current, the ampere
- Transient absorption spectroscopy, a type of time-resolved spectroscopy

=== Other uses in science and technology ===
- EMC TA, an American diesel-powered locomotive
- Technician or technical assistant, in laboratories
- Teraannum, a unit of time equal to 10^{12} years
- Terminal adapter, a device that connects a terminal computer to an ISDN network
- Thematic analysis, a research method in social and applied sciences
- Traffic announcement (radio data systems), a feature of radio data systems
- Traffic Advisory, a TCAS alert

== Transportation ==
- T/A (Trans-Am), a performance trim for Dodge Challenger and Pontiac Firebird

== See also ==
- T & A (disambiguation)
