= T =

Twentieth letter of the Latin alphabet

- T t

Usage
- Writing system: Latin script
- Type: Alphabetic and logographic
- Language of origin: Latin language
- Sound values: [t]; [ʈ]; [tʰ]; [tʼ]; [d]; [ð]; [t̪]; [t͡ʃ]; [ɾ]; [ʔ]
- In Unicode: U+0054, U+0074
- Alphabetical position: 20

History
Development
Z9
      - 𐤕
        - Ττ
          - 𐌕
            - T t
- Time period: c. 700 BCE to present
- Descendants: Th (digraph); ™; ₮; ₸; Ŧ; Ť; Ţ; Ʇ
- Sisters: 𐍄; Т; Ҭ; Ћ; Ҵ; ת; ت; ܬ; ة; ࠕ; 𐎚; 𐎙; ተ; ፐ; Տ տ; Ց ց; त; ट; ત; ટ; ⶊ

Other
- Associated graphs: t(x), th, tzsch
- Writing direction: Left-to-right

T (minuscule: t) is the twentieth letter of the Latin alphabet, used in the modern English alphabet, the alphabets of other western European languages and others worldwide. Its name in English is tee (pronounced /ˈtiː/), plural tees.

It is derived from the Semitic Taw 𐤕 of the Phoenician and Paleo-Hebrew script (Aramaic and Hebrew Taw ת/𐡕/, Syriac Taw ܬ, and Arabic ت Tāʼ) via the Greek letter τ (tau). In English, it is most commonly used to represent the voiceless alveolar plosive, a sound it also denotes in the International Phonetic Alphabet. It is the most commonly used consonant and the second-most commonly used letter in English-language texts.

== History ==
Phoenician Taw	Western Greek Tau	Etruscan T	Latin T

Taw was the last letter of the Western Semitic and Hebrew alphabets. The sound value of Semitic Taw, the Greek alphabet Tαυ (Tau), Old Italic and Latin T has remained fairly constant, representing [t] in each of these, and it has also kept its original basic shape in most of these alphabets.

== Use in writing systems ==
Pronunciation of ⟨t⟩ by language
Orthography	Phonemes
Catalan	/t/
Standard Chinese (Pinyin)	/tʰ/
English	/t/, silent
French	/t/, silent
German	/t/
Icelandic	/tʰ/
Indonesian	/t/
Portuguese	/t/
Portuguese	[t͡ʃ], allophone of /t/ before /i/, /ĩ/ and /j/ in some Brazilian dialects
Spanish	/t/
Turkish	/t/

=== English ===
In English, ⟨t⟩ usually denotes the voiceless alveolar plosive (International Phonetic Alphabet: /t/), as in tart, tee, or ties, often with aspiration at the beginnings of words or before stressed vowels. The letter ⟨t⟩ corresponds to the affricate /t͡ʃ/ in some words as a result of yod-coalescence (for example, in words ending in -"ture", such as future).

A common digraph is ⟨th⟩, which usually represents a dental fricative, but occasionally represents /t/ (as in Thomas and thyme). The digraph ⟨ti⟩ often corresponds to the sound /ʃ/ (a voiceless palato-alveolar sibilant) word-medially when followed by a vowel, as in nation, ratio, negotiation, and Croatia.

In a few words of modern French origin, the letter T is silent at the end of a word; these include croquet and debut. and it's also silent in native words and some words of Old French origin; these include thistle and castle.

=== Other languages ===
In the orthographies of other languages, ⟨t⟩ is often used for /t/, the voiceless dental plosive /t̪/, or similar sounds.

=== Other systems ===
In the International Phonetic Alphabet, ⟨t⟩ denotes the voiceless alveolar plosive.

== Other uses ==
- Unit prefix T, meaning 1,000,000,000,000 times.

== Related characters ==
=== Descendants and related characters in the Latin alphabet ===
A curly T pictured in the coat of arms of the former Teisko municipality, which was consolidated to Tampere.

- T with diacritics: Ť ť Ṫ ṫ ẗ Ţ ţ Ṭ ṭ Ʈ ʈ Ț ț ƫ Ṱ ṱ Ṯ ṯ Ŧ ŧ Ⱦ ⱦ Ƭ ƭ ᵵ ᶵ
- Ꞇ ꞇ : Insular T, (Note: Unicode treats representation of letters of the Latin alphabet written in insular script as a typeface choice that needs no separate coding. U+A786 Ꞇ LATIN CAPITAL LETTER INSULAR T and U+A787 ꞇ LATIN SMALL LETTER INSULAR T are provided for use by phonetics specialists.) also used by William Pryce to designate the voiceless dental fricative [θ]
- ᫎ : Combining small insular t was used in the Ormulum
- ʇ : Turned small t is used in the International Phonetic Alphabet (IPA)
- 𐞯 : Modifier letter small t with retroflex hook is a superscript IPA letter
- 𝼉 : Latin small letter t with hook and retroflex hook is a symbol for a voiceless retroflex implosive
- 𝼍 : Latin small turned t with curl is a click letter
- Uralic Phonetic Alphabet-specific symbols related to T:
  - U+1D1B ᴛ LATIN LETTER SMALL CAPITAL T
  - U+1D40 ᵀ MODIFIER LETTER CAPITAL T
  - U+1D57 ᵗ MODIFIER LETTER SMALL T
  - U+1E97 ẗ LATIN SMALL LETTER T WITH DIAERESIS
- ₜ : Subscript small t was used in the Uralic Phonetic Alphabet prior to its formal standardization in 1902
- ȶ : T with curl is used in Sino-Tibetanist linguistics
- Ʇ ʇ : Turned capital T and turned small t were used in transcriptions of the Dakota language in publications of the American Board of Ethnology in the late 19th century.
- 𝼪 : Small t with mid-height left hook was used by the British and Foreign Bible Society in the early 20th century for romanization of the Malayalam language.

=== Ancestors and siblings in other alphabets ===
- 𐤕 : Semitic letter Taw, from which the following symbols originally derive:
  - Τ τ : Greek letter Tau
    - Ⲧ ⲧ : Coptic letter Taw, which derives from Greek Tau
    - Т т : Cyrillic letter Te, also derived from Tau
    - 𐍄 : Gothic letter tius, which derives from Greek Tau
    - 𐌕 : Old Italic T, which derives from Greek Tau, and is the ancestor of modern Latin T
      - ᛏ : Runic letter teiwaz, which probably derives from old Italic T
- ፐ : One of the 26 consonantal letters of the Ge'ez script. The Ge'ez abugida developed under the influence of Christian scripture by adding obligatory vocalic diacritics to the consonantal letters. Pesa ፐ is based on Tawe ተ.

=== Derived signs, symbols and abbreviations ===
- ™ : Trademark symbol
- ₮ : Mongolian tögrög
- ₸ : Kazakhstani tenge
- ৳ : Bangladeshi taka

== Other representations ==
=== Computing ===
Unicode:

- U+0054 T LATIN CAPITAL LETTER T
- U+0074 t LATIN SMALL LETTER T
- U+FF34 Ｔ FULLWIDTH LATIN CAPITAL LETTER T
- U+FF54 ｔ FULLWIDTH LATIN SMALL LETTER T

Codepoints 0054_{16} (84_{10}) and x0074_{16} (116_{10}) were used for encodings based on ASCII, including the DOS, Windows, ISO-8859 and Macintosh families of encodings.

=== Other ===
NATO phonetic	Morse code
Tango	▄▄▄

Signal flag

Flag semaphore
American manual alphabet (ASL fingerspelling)
British manual alphabet (BSL fingerspelling)
Braille dots-2345
Unified English Braille

The letter T in German Sign Language
