= TNA =

TNA may refer to:

== Organisations ==
- Tamil National Alliance, a political coalition in Sri Lanka
- The National Alliance, a political party in Kenya
- The National Archives (United Kingdom), a UK public body
- Tonga Nurses' Association, a trade union
- Trans Nation Airways, an Ethiopian charter airline

== Science and technology ==
- Threose nucleic acid, an artificial genetic polymer
- 2,4,6-Trinitroaniline, a nitrated amine
- Time and attendance, a system that monitors and records employee attendance

== Sports ==
- Total Nonstop Action Wrestling, American professional wrestling promotion
- Torneo Nacional de Ascenso, former name of La Liga Argentina de Básquet, a division of the Argentine basketball league

== Transport ==
- TNA, IATA code for Jinan Yaoqiang International Airport, China
- TNA, ICAO code for TransAsia Airways
- TNA, National Rail code for Thornton Abbey railway station
- TNA, code for Thane railway station, Maharashtra, India

== Other uses ==
- TNA (Airborne nuclear warhead), a French thermonuclear warhead
- TNA, a clothing brand of Aritzia
- tna, ISO 639 code for Tacana language
- TNA Media, owner of The New Age
- TNA Park, a multi-use stadium in Tarkwa, Ghana
- Tashi Namgyal Academy, a public school in Sikkim, India
- The New American, a print magazine
- Training needs analysis, the process of identifying the gap between training and needs

== See also ==
- Mr. TNA (disambiguation)
- T & A (disambiguation)
