= Ṭa =

Letter "Ṭa" in Indic scripts

Example glyphs
- Bengali–Assamese: Ṭa
- Tibetan: ཊ
- Tamil: Ṭa
- Thai: ฎ
- Malayalam: ട
- Sinhala: ට
- Ashoka Brahmi: Ṭa
- Devanagari: Ṭa

Cognates
- Hebrew: ט
- Greek: Θ
- Cyrillic: Ѳ

Properties
- Phonemic representation: /ʈ/ /ɗ/^{B} /t/^{C}
- IAST transliteration: ṭa Ṭa
- ISCII code point: BD (189)
- ^B for initial value in Khmer^C for final value in Khmer

Ṭa is a consonant of Indic abugidas. It is derived from the early "Ashoka" Brahmi letter after having gone through the Gupta letter. As with the other retroflex consonants, ṭa is absent from most scripts not used for a language of India.

== Āryabhaṭa numeration ==
Aryabhata used Devanagari letters for numbers, very similar to the Greek numerals, even after the invention of Indian numerals. The values of the different forms of ट are:

- ट [ʈə] = 11 (११)
- टि [ʈɪ] = 1,100 (१ १००)
- टु [ʈʊ] = 110,000 (१ १० ०००)
- टृ [ʈri] = 11,000,000 (१ १० ०० ०००)
- टॢ [ʈlə] = 1,100,000,000 (१ १० ०० ०० ०००)
- टे [ʈe] = 11×10^{10} (११×१०^{१०})
- टै [ʈɛː] = 11×10^{12} (११×१०^{१२})
- टो [ʈoː] = 11×10^{14} (११×१०^{१४})
- टौ [ʈɔː] = 11×10^{16} (११×१०^{१६})

== Historic Tta ==
There are three different general early historic scripts - Brahmi and its variants, Kharoṣṭhī, and Tocharian, the so-called slanting Brahmi. Tta as found in standard Brahmi, was a simple geometric shape, with variations toward more flowing forms by the Gupta. The Tocharian Tta did not have an alternate Fremdzeichen form. The third form of tta, in Kharoshthi was probably derived from Aramaic separately from the Brahmi letter.

=== Brahmi Tta ===
The Brahmi letter, Tta, is probably derived from the altered Aramaic Teth, and is thus related to the modern Greek Theta. Several identifiable styles of writing the Brahmi Tta can be found, most associated with a specific set of inscriptions from an artifact or diverse records from an historic period. As the earliest and most geometric style of Brahmi, the letters found on the Edicts of Ashoka and other records from around that time are normally the reference form for Brahmi letters, with vowel marks not attested until later forms of Brahmi back-formed to match the geometric writing style.

Brahmi Tta historic forms
Ashoka (3rd-1st c. BCE)	Girnar (~150 BCE)	Kushana (~150-250 CE)	Gujarat (~250 CE)	Gupta (~350 CE)

=== Tocharian Tta ===
The Tocharian letter is derived from the Brahmi, but does not have an alternate Fremdzeichen form.

Tocharian Tta with vowel marks
Tta	Ttā	Tti	Ttī	Ttu	Ttū	Ttr	Ttr̄	Tte	Ttai	Tto	Ttau	Ttä

=== Kharoṣṭhī Tta ===
The Kharoṣṭhī letter is generally accepted as being derived from the altered Aramaic Teth, and is thus related to Theta, in addition to the Brahmi Tta.

== Devanagari script ==
Ṭa (ट) is the eleventh consonant of the Devanagari abugida. It ultimately arose from the Brahmi letter, after having gone through the Gupta letter. Letters that derive from it are the Gujarati letter ટ, and the Modi letter 𑘘.

=== Devanagari-using Languages ===
In many languages, ट is pronounced as [ʈə] or [ʈ] when appropriate. In Marathi, ट is sometimes pronounced as [tə] or [t] in addition to [ʈə] or [ʈ]. Like all Indic scripts, Devanagari uses vowel marks attached to the base consonant to override the inherent /ə/ vowel:

Devanagari ट with vowel marks
Ṭa	Ṭā	Ṭi	Ṭī	Ṭu	Ṭū	Ṭr	Ṭr̄	Ṭl	Ṭl̄	Ṭe	Ṭai	Ṭo	Ṭau	Ṭ
ट	टा	टि	टी	टु	टू	टृ	टॄ	टॢ	टॣ	टे	टै	टो	टौ	ट्

=== Conjuncts with ट ===
Devanagari exhibits conjunct ligatures, as is common in Indic scripts. In modern Devanagari texts, most conjuncts are formed by reducing the letter shape to fit tightly to the following letter, usually by dropping a character's vertical stem, sometimes referred to as a "half form". Some conjunct clusters are always represented by a true ligature, instead of a shape that can be broken into constituent independent letters. Vertically stacked conjuncts are ubiquitous in older texts, while only a few are still used routinely in modern Devanagari texts. Lacking a vertical stem to drop for making a half form, Ṭa either forms a stacked conjunct/ligature, or uses its full form with Virama. The use of ligatures and vertical conjuncts may vary across languages using the Devanagari script, with Marathi in particular avoiding their use where other languages would use them.

==== Ligature conjuncts of ट ====
True ligatures are quite rare in Indic scripts. The most common ligated conjuncts in Devanagari are in the form of a slight mutation to fit in context or as a consistent variant form appended to the adjacent characters. Those variants include Na and the Repha and Rakar forms of Ra. Nepali and Marathi texts use the "eyelash" Ra half form for an initial "R" instead of repha.

- Repha र্ (r) + ट (ṭa) gives the ligature rṭa: ^{note}

- Eyelash र্ (r) + ट (ṭa) gives the ligature rṭa:

- ट্ (ṭ) + rakar र (ra) gives the ligature ṭra:

- प্ (p) + ट (ṭa) gives the ligature pṭa:

- ष্ (ṣ) + ट (ṭa) gives the ligature ṣṭa:

- Repha र্ (r) + ष্ (ṣ) + ट্ (ṭ) + rakar र (ra) gives the ligature rṣṭra:

- ष্ (ṣ) + ट্ (ṭ) + व (va) gives the ligature ṣṭva:

==== Stacked conjuncts of ट ====
Vertically stacked ligatures are the most common conjunct forms found in Devanagari text. Although the constituent characters may need to be stretched and moved slightly in order to stack neatly, stacked conjuncts can be broken down into recognizable base letters, or a letter and an otherwise standard ligature.

- छ্ (c^{h}) + ट (ṭa) gives the ligature c^{h}ṭa:

- ढ্ (ḍʱ) + ट (ṭa) gives the ligature ḍʱṭa:

- ड্ (ḍ) + ट (ṭa) gives the ligature ḍṭa:

- द্ (d) + ट (ṭa) gives the ligature dṭa:

- ङ্ (ŋ) + ट (ṭa) gives the ligature ŋṭa:

- ट্ (ṭ) + ब (ba) gives the ligature ṭba:

- ट্ (ṭ) + भ (b^{h}a) gives the ligature ṭb^{h}a:

- ट্ (ṭ) + च (ca) gives the ligature ṭca:

- ट্ (ṭ) + छ (c^{h}a) gives the ligature ṭc^{h}a:

- ट্ (ṭ) + द (da) gives the ligature ṭda:

- ट্ (ṭ) + ड (ḍa) gives the ligature ṭḍa:

- ट্ (ṭ) + ढ (ḍʱa) gives the ligature ṭḍʱa:

- ट্ (ṭ) + ध (dʱa) gives the ligature ṭdʱa:

- ट্ (ṭ) + ग (ga) gives the ligature ṭga:

- ट্ (ṭ) + घ (ɡʱa) gives the ligature ṭɡʱa:

- ट্ (ṭ) + ह (ha) gives the ligature ṭha:

- ठ্ (ṭ^{h}) + ट (ṭa) gives the ligature ṭ^{h}ṭa:

- ट্ (ṭ) + ज (ja) gives the ligature ṭja:

- ट্ (ṭ) + झ (j^{h}a) gives the ligature ṭj^{h}a:

- ट্ (ṭ) + ज্ (j) + ञ (ña) gives the ligature ṭjña:

- ट্ (ṭ) + क (ka) gives the ligature ṭka:

- ट্ (ṭ) + ख (k^{h}a) gives the ligature ṭk^{h}a:

- ट্ (ṭ) + क্ (k) + ष (ṣa) gives the ligature ṭkṣa:

- ट্ (ṭ) + ल (la) gives the ligature ṭla:

- ट্ (ṭ) + ळ (ḷa) gives the ligature ṭḷa:

- ट্ (ṭ) + म (ma) gives the ligature ṭma:

- ट্ (ṭ) + न (na) gives the ligature ṭna:

- ट্ (ṭ) + ङ (ŋa) gives the ligature ṭŋa:

- ट্ (ṭ) + ण (ṇa) gives the ligature ṭṇa:

- ट্ (ṭ) + ञ (ña) gives the ligature ṭña:

- ट্ (ṭ) + प (pa) gives the ligature ṭpa:

- ट্ (ṭ) + फ (p^{h}a) gives the ligature ṭp^{h}a:

- ट্ (ṭ) + स (sa) gives the ligature ṭsa:

- ट্ (ṭ) + श (ʃa) gives the ligature ṭʃa:

- ट্ (ṭ) + ष (ṣa) gives the ligature ṭṣa:

- ट্ (ṭ) + त (ta) gives the ligature ṭta:

- ट্ (ṭ) + थ (t^{h}a) gives the ligature ṭt^{h}a:

- ट্ (ṭ) + ट (ṭa) gives the ligature ṭṭa:

- ट্ (ṭ) + ठ (ṭ^{h}a) gives the ligature ṭṭ^{h}a:

- ट্ (ṭ) + व (va) gives the ligature ṭva:

- ट্ (ṭ) + य (ya) gives the ligature ṭya:

== Bengali script ==
The Bengali script ট is derived from the Siddhaṃ, and is marked by a similar horizontal head line, but less geometric shape, than its Devanagari counterpart, ट. The inherent vowel of Bengali consonant letters is /ɔ/, so the bare letter ট will sometimes be transliterated as "tto" instead of "tta". Adding okar, the "o" vowel mark, gives a reading of /t̳o/. Like all Indic consonants, ট can be modified by marks to indicate another (or no) vowel than its inherent "a".

Bengali ট with vowel marks
tta	ttā	tti	ttī	ttu	ttū	ttr	ttr̄	tte	ttai	tto	ttau	tt
ট	টা	টি	টী	টু	টূ	টৃ	টৄ	টে	টৈ	টো	টৌ	ট্

=== ট in Bengali-using languages ===
ট is used as a basic consonant character in all of the major Bengali script orthographies, including Bengali and Assamese.

=== Conjuncts with ট ===
Bengali ট exhibits conjunct ligatures, as is common in Indic scripts, and commonly shows both stacked and linear (horizontal) ligatures.

- ক্ (k) + ট (ṭa) gives the ligature kṭa:

- ক্ (k) + ট্ (ṭ) + র (ra) gives the ligature kṭra, with the ra phala suffix:

- ল্ (l) + ট (ṭa) gives the ligature lṭa:

- ণ্ (ṇ) + ট (ṭa) gives the ligature ṇṭa:

- ন্ (n) + ট (ṭa) gives the ligature nṭa:

- ন্ (n) + ট্ (ṭ) + র (ra) gives the ligature nṭra, with the ra phala suffix:

- প্ (p) + ট (ṭa) gives the ligature pṭa:

- র্ (r) + ট (ṭa) gives the ligature rṭa, with the repha prefix:

- ষ্ (ṣ) + ট (ṭa) gives the ligature ṣṭa:

- ষ্ (ṣ) + ট্ (ṭ) + র (ra) gives the ligature ṣṭra, with the ra phala suffix:

- ষ্ (ṣ) + ট্ (ṭ) + য (ya) gives the ligature ṣṭya, with the ya phala suffix:

- স্ (s) + ট (ṭa) gives the ligature sṭa:

- স্ (s) + ট্ (ṭ) + র (ra) gives the ligature sṭra, with the ra phala suffix:

- ট্ (ṭ) + ম (ma) gives the ligature ṭma:

- ট্ (ṭ) + র (ra) gives the ligature ṭra, with the ra phala suffix:

- ট্ (ṭ) + ট (ṭa) gives the ligature ṭṭa:

- ট্ (ṭ) + ব (va) gives the ligature ṭva, with the va phala suffix:

- ট্ (ṭ) + য (ya) gives the ligature ṭya, with the ya phala suffix:

== Gujarati Ṭa ==
Gujarati Ṭa.

Ṭa (ટ) is the eleventh consonant of the Gujarati abugida. It is derived from the Devanagari Ṭa ट with the top bar (shiro rekha) removed, and ultimately the Brahmi letter.

=== Gujarati-using Languages ===
The Gujarati script is used to write the Gujarati and Kutchi languages. In both languages, ટ is pronounced as [ʈə] or [ʈ] when appropriate. Like all Indic scripts, Gujarati uses vowel marks attached to the base consonant to override the inherent /ə/ vowel:

Ṭa	Ṭā	Ṭi	Ṭī	Ṭu	Ṭū	Ṭr	Ṭl	Ṭr̄	Ṭl̄	Ṭĕ	Ṭe	Ṭai	Ṭŏ	Ṭo	Ṭau	Ṭ
Gujarati Ṭa syllables, with vowel marks in red.

=== Conjuncts with ટ ===
Gujarati ટ exhibits conjunct ligatures, much like its parent Devanagari Script. While most Gujarati conjuncts can only be formed by reducing the letter shape to create a "half form" that fits tightly to following letter, Ṭa does not have a half form. A few conjunct clusters can be represented by a true ligature, instead of a shape that can be broken into constituent independent letters, and vertically stacked conjuncts can also be found in Gujarati, although much less commonly than in Devanagari. Lacking a half form, Ṭa will normally use an explicit virama when forming conjuncts without a true ligature. True ligatures are quite rare in Indic scripts. The most common ligated conjuncts in Gujarati are in the form of a slight mutation to fit in context or as a consistent variant form appended to the adjacent characters. Those variants include Na and the Repha and Rakar forms of Ra.

- ર્ (r) + ટ (ʈa) gives the ligature RṬa:

- ટ્ (ʈ) + ર (ra) gives the ligature ṬRa:

- ટ્ (ʈ) + ટ (ʈa) gives the ligature ṬṬa:

- ટ્ (ʈ) + ઠ (ʈ^{h}a) gives the ligature ṬṬha:

- ટ્ (ʈ) + વ (va) gives the ligature ṬVa:

== Burmese script ==
Ta T'lin Cheik (ဋ) is the eleventh letter of the Burmese script.

== Thai script ==
Do Chada (ฎ) and To Patak (ฏ) are the fourteenth and fifteenth letters of the Thai script. As with ta and pa, the Indic letter has been split into two letters to distinguish the originally preglottalised (and now voiced) sound from the voiceless sound.

Do Chada

=== Do chada ===
Do chada falls under the middle class of Thai consonants. In IPA, do chada is pronounced as [d] at the beginning of a syllable and as [t̚] at the end of a syllable. The 20th letter of the alphabet, do dek (ด), is also named do and falls under the middle class of Thai consonants. Thai consonants do not form conjunct ligatures, and may use the pinthu—an explicit virama with a dot shape—to indicate bare consonants. In the acrophony of the Thai script, chada (ชฎา) means 'headdress'. Do chada and to patak both correspond to the Devanagari character 'ट'.

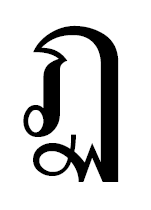
To Patak

=== To patak ===
To patak falls under the middle class of Thai consonants. In IPA, to patak is pronounced as [t] at the beginning of a syllable and may not be used to close a syllable. The 21st letter of the alphabet, to tao (ต), is also named to and falls under the middle class of Thai consonants. Thai consonants do not form conjunct ligatures, and may use the pinthu—an explicit virama with a dot shape—to indicate bare consonants. In the acrophony of the Thai script, patak (ปฏัก) means '(cattle) goad'. Do chada and to patak both correspond to the Devanagari character 'ट'.

== Telugu Ṭa ==
Telugu independent and subjoined Ṭa.

Ṭa (ట) is a consonant of the Telugu abugida. It ultimately arose from the Brahmi letter. It is closely related to the Kannada letter ಟ. Since it lacks the v-shaped headstroke common to most Telugu letters, X remains unaltered by most vowel matras, and its subjoined form is simply a smaller version of the normal letter shape. Telugu conjuncts are created by reducing trailing letters to a subjoined form that appears below the initial consonant of the conjunct. Many subjoined forms are created by dropping their headline, with many extending the end of the stroke of the main letter body to form an extended tail reaching up to the right of the preceding consonant. This subjoining of trailing letters to create conjuncts is in contrast to the leading half forms of Devanagari and Bengali letters. Ligature conjuncts are not a feature in Telugu, with the only non-standard construction being an alternate subjoined form of Ṣa (borrowed from Kannada) in the KṢa conjunct.

== Malayalam Ṭa ==
Malayalam letter Ṭa

Ṭa (ട) is a consonant of the Malayalam abugida. It ultimately arose from the Brahmi letter, via the Grantha letter Tta. Like in other Indic scripts, Malayalam consonants have the inherent vowel "a", and take one of several modifying vowel signs to represent syllables with another vowel or no vowel at all.

Malayalam Tta matras: Tta, Ttā, Tti, Ttī, Ttu, Ttū, Ttr̥, Ttr̥̄, Ttl̥, Ttl̥̄, Tte, Ttē, Ttai, Tto, Ttō, Ttau, and Tt.

=== Conjuncts of ട ===
As is common in Indic scripts, Malayalam joins letters together to form conjunct consonant clusters. There are several ways in which conjuncts are formed in Malayalam texts: using a post-base form of a trailing consonant placed under the initial consonant of a conjunct, a combined ligature of two or more consonants joined together, a conjoining form that appears as a combining mark on the rest of the conjunct, the use of an explicit candrakkala mark to suppress the inherent "a" vowel, or a special consonant form called a "chillu" letter, representing a bare consonant without the inherent "a" vowel. Texts written with the modern reformed Malayalam orthography, put̪iya lipi, may favor more regular conjunct forms than older texts in paḻaya lipi, due to changes undertaken in the 1970s by the Government of Kerala.

- ക് (k) + ട (ṭa) gives the ligature kṭa:

- ട് (ṭ) + ട (ṭa) gives the ligature ṭṭa:

- ണ് (ṇ) + ട (ṭa) gives the ligature ṇṭa:

- ഷ് (ṣ) + ട (ṭa) gives the ligature ṣṭa:

== Canadian Aboriginal Syllabics Te ==
ᑌ, ᑎ, ᑐ and ᑕ are the base characters "Te", "Ti", "To" and "Ta" in the Canadian Aboriginal Syllabics. The bare consonant ᑦ (T) is a small version of the A-series letter ᑕ, although the Western Cree letter ᐟ, derived from Pitman shorthand was the original bare consonant symbol for T. The character ᑌ is derived from a handwritten form of the Devanagari letter ट, without the headline or vertical stem, and the forms for different vowels are derived by rotation. Unlike most writing systems without legacy computer encodings, complex Canadian syllabic letters are represented in Unicode with pre-composed characters, rather than with base characters and diacritical marks.

Variant	E-series		I-series		O-series		A-series			Other
T + vowel	ᑌ		ᑎ		ᑐ		ᑕ			ᢷ
T + vowel	Te		Ti		To		Ta			Tay
Small	-		ᣕ		-		ᑦ			ᐟ
Small	-		Ojibway T		-		T			Cree T
T with long vowels	-		ᑏ		ᑑ	ᑒ	ᑖ			ᑍ
T with long vowels	-		Tī		Tō	Cree Tō	Tā			Tāi
T + W-vowels	ᑗ	ᑘ	ᑙ	ᑚ	ᑝ	ᑞ	ᑡ		ᑢ	-
T + W-vowels	Twe	Cree Twe	Twi	Cree Twi	Two	Cree Two	Twa		Cree Twa	-
T + long W-vowels	-		ᑛ	ᑜ	ᑟ	ᑠ	ᑣ	ᑥ	ᑤ	-
T + long W-vowels	-		Twī	Cree Twī	Twō	Cree Twō	Twā	Naskapi Twā	Cree Twā	-
Tt + vowel	ᑧ		ᑨ		ᑩ		ᑪ			-
Tt + vowel	Tte		Tti		Tto		Tta			
Ty + vowel	ᕰ		ᕱ		ᕲ		ᕳ			-
Ty + vowel	Tye		Tyi		Tyo		Tya			
Tth + vowel	ᕫ		ᕬ		ᕭ		ᕮ			-
Tth + vowel	Tthe		Tthi		Ttho		Ttha			
Tth other	ᣥ		-		ᣦ		ᣧ			-
Tth other	Tthwe		-		Tthoo		Tthaa			

== Odia Ṭa ==
Odia independent and subjoined letter Ṭa.

Ṭa (ଟ) is a consonant of the Odia abugida. It ultimately arose from the Brahmi letter, via the Siddhaṃ letter Tta. Like in other Indic scripts, Odia consonants have the inherent vowel "a", and take one of several modifying vowel signs to represent syllables with another vowel or no vowel at all.

Odia Tta with vowel matras
Tta	Ttā	Tti	Ttī	Ttu	Ttū	Ttr̥	Ttr̥̄	Ttl̥	Ttl̥̄	Tte	Ttai	Tto	Ttau	Tt
ଟ	ଟା	ଟି	ଟୀ	ଟୁ	ଟୂ	ଟୃ	ଟୄ	ଟୢ	ଟୣ	ଟେ	ଟୈ	ଟୋ	ଟୌ	ଟ୍

=== Conjuncts of ଟ ===
As is common in Indic scripts, Odia joins letters together to form conjunct consonant clusters. The most common conjunct formation is achieved by using a small subjoined form of trailing consonants. Most consonants' subjoined forms are identical to the full form, just reduced in size, although a few drop the curved headline or have a subjoined form not directly related to the full form of the consonant. The second type of conjunct formation is through pure ligatures, where the constituent consonants are written together in a single graphic form. This ligature may be recognizable as being a combination of two characters or it can have a conjunct ligature unrelated to its constituent characters.

- ଟ୍ (ṭ) + ଟ (ṭa) gives the ligature ṭṭa:

== Kaithi Ṭa ==
Kaithi consonant Ṭa.

Ṭa (𑂗) is a consonant of the Kaithi abugida. It ultimately arose from the Brahmi letter, via the Siddhaṃ letter Tta. Like in other Indic scripts, Kaithi consonants have the inherent vowel "a", and take one of several modifying vowel signs to represent syllables with another vowel or no vowel at all.

Kaithi Tta with vowel matras
Tta	Ttā	Tti	Ttī	Ttu	Ttū	Tte	Ttai	Tto	Ttau	Tt
𑂗	𑂗𑂰	𑂗𑂱	𑂗𑂲	𑂗𑂳	𑂗𑂴	𑂗𑂵	𑂗𑂶	𑂗𑂷	𑂗𑂸	𑂗𑂹

=== Conjuncts of 𑂗 ===
As is common in Indic scripts, Kaithi joins letters together to form conjunct consonant clusters. The most common conjunct formation is achieved by using a half form of preceding consonants, although several consonants use an explicit virama. Most half forms are derived from the full form by removing the vertical stem. As is common in most Indic scripts, conjuncts of ra are indicated with a repha or rakar mark attached to the rest of the consonant cluster. In addition, there are a few vertical conjuncts that can be found in Kaithi writing, but true ligatures are not used in the modern Kaithi script.

- 𑂩୍ (r) + 𑂗 (ṭa) gives the ligature rṭa:

== Tirhuta Ṭa ==
Tirhuta consonant Ṭa

Ṭa (𑒙) is a consonant of the Tirhuta abugida. It ultimately arose from the Brahmi letter, via the Siddhaṃ letter Tta. Like in other Indic scripts, Tirhuta consonants have the inherent vowel "a", and take one of several modifying vowel signs to represent sylables with another vowel or no vowel at all.

Tirhuta Ṭa with vowel matras
Ṭa	Ṭā	Ṭi	Ṭī	Ṭu	Ṭū	Ṭṛ	Ṭṝ	Ṭḷ	Ṭḹ	Ṭē	Ṭe	Ṭai	Ṭō	Ṭo	Ṭau	Ṭ
𑒙	𑒙𑒰	𑒙𑒱	𑒙𑒲	𑒙𑒳	𑒙𑒴	𑒙𑒵	𑒙𑒶	𑒙𑒷	𑒙𑒸	𑒙𑒹	𑒙𑒺	𑒙𑒻	𑒙𑒼	𑒙𑒽	𑒙𑒾	𑒙𑓂

=== Conjuncts of 𑒙 ===
As is common in Indic scripts, Tirhuta joins letters together to form conjunct consonant clusters. The most common conjunct formation is achieved by using an explicit virama. As is common in most Indic scripts, conjuncts of ra are indicated with a repha or rakar mark attached to the rest of the consonant cluster. In addition, other consonants take unique combining forms when in conjunct with other letters, and there are several vertical conjuncts and true ligatures that can be found in Tirhuta writing.

- 𑒝୍ (ṇ) + 𑒙 (ṭa) gives the ligature ṇṭa:

- 𑒩୍ (r) + 𑒙 (ṭa) gives the ligature rṭa:

- 𑒭୍ (ṣ) + 𑒙 (ṭa) gives the ligature ṣṭa:

- 𑒙୍ (ṭ) + 𑒩 (ra) gives the ligature ṭra:

- 𑒞୍ (t) + 𑒙 (ṭa) gives the ligature tṭa:

- 𑒙୍ (ṭ) + 𑒙 (ṭa) gives the ligature ṭṭa:

- 𑒙୍ (ṭ) + 𑒚 (ṭʰa) gives the ligature ṭṭʰa:

- 𑒙୍ (ṭ) + 𑒫 (va) gives the ligature ṭva:

== Comparison of Ṭa ==
The various Indic scripts are generally related to each other through adaptation and borrowing, and as such the glyphs for cognate letters, including Ṭa, are related as well.

Comparison of Ṭa in different scripts

Aramaic
Kharoṣṭhī	Ashoka Brahmi	Kushana Brahmi (Note: The middle "Kushana" form of Brahmi is a later style that emerged as Brahmi scripts were beginning to proliferate. Gupta Brahmi was definitely a stylistic descendant from Kushana, but other Brahmi-derived scripts may have descended from earlier forms.)	Tocharian (Note: Tocharian is probably derived from the middle period "Kushana" form of Brahmi, although artifacts from that time are not plentiful enough to establish a definite succession.)
Gupta Brahmi	Pallava
Kadamba -
Bhaiksuki 𑰘	Siddhaṃ	Grantha 𑌟	Cham -
Sinhala ට	Pyu / Old Mon (Note: Pyu and Old Mon are probably the precursors of the Burmese script, and may be derived from either the Pallava or Kadamba script) -
Tibetan ཊ	Newa 𑐚	Ahom -	Malayalam ട
Telugu ట	Burmese ဋ
Lepcha -	Ranjana	Saurashtra ꢜ	Dives Akuru 𑤖
Kannada ಟ	Kayah Li -
Limbu -	Soyombo (Note: May also be derived from Devangari (see bottom left of table)) 𑩦	Khmer ដ	Tamil
Chakma 𑄑	Tai Tham ᨭ
Meitei Mayek -	Gaudi -	Thai ฏ / ฎ	Lao ຏ
Tai Le -
Marchen -	Tirhuta 𑒙	New Tai Lue -	Tai Viet -	Aksara Kawi
'Phags-pa -	Odia ଟ	Sharada 𑆛	Rejang -	Batak -	Buginese -
Zanabazar Square 𑨔	Bengali–Assamese	Takri 𑚔	Javanese ꦛ	Balinese ᬝ	Makasar -
Hangul (Note: The Origin of Hangul from 'Phags-pa is one of limited influence, inspiring at most a few basic letter shapes. Hangul does not function as an Indic abugida.) -	Northern Nagari -	Dogri 𑠔	Laṇḍā -	Sundanese -	Baybayin -
Modi 𑘘	Gujarati ટ	Khojki -	Khudabadi 𑋆	Mahajani 𑅞	Tagbanwa -
Devanagari	Nandinagari 𑦸	Kaithi	Gurmukhi ਟ	Multani 𑊐	Buhid -
Canadian Syllabics (Note: Although the basic letter forms of the Canadian Aboriginal Syllabics were derived from handwritten Devanagari letters, this abugida indicates vowel sounds by rotations of the letter form, rather than the use of vowel diacritics as is standard in Indic abugidas.) ᑌ	Soyombo (Note: May also be derived from Ranjana (see above)) 𑩦	Sylheti Nagari ꠐ	Gunjala Gondi 𑵽	Masaram Gondi (Note: Masaram Gondi acts as an Indic abugida, but its letterforms were not derived from any single precursor script.) 𑴖	Hanuno'o -

== Character encodings of Ṭa ==
Most Indic scripts are encoded in the Unicode Standard, and as such the letter Ṭa in those scripts can be represented in plain text with unique codepoint. Ṭa from several modern-use scripts can also be found in legacy encodings, such as ISCII.

Character information
Preview							ట		ଟ		ಟ		ട		ટ		ਟ	
Unicode name	DEVANAGARI LETTER TTA		BENGALI LETTER TTA		TAMIL LETTER TTA		TELUGU LETTER TTA		ORIYA LETTER TTA		KANNADA LETTER TTA		MALAYALAM LETTER TTA		GUJARATI LETTER TTA		GURMUKHI LETTER TTA	
Encodings	decimal	hex	dec	hex	dec	hex	dec	hex	dec	hex	dec	hex	dec	hex	dec	hex	dec	hex
Unicode	2335	U+091F	2463	U+099F	2975	U+0B9F	3103	U+0C1F	2847	U+0B1F	3231	U+0C9F	3359	U+0D1F	2719	U+0A9F	2591	U+0A1F
UTF-8	224 164 159	E0 A4 9F	224 166 159	E0 A6 9F	224 174 159	E0 AE 9F	224 176 159	E0 B0 9F	224 172 159	E0 AC 9F	224 178 159	E0 B2 9F	224 180 159	E0 B4 9F	224 170 159	E0 AA 9F	224 168 159	E0 A8 9F
Numeric character reference	&#2335;	&#x91F;	&#2463;	&#x99F;	&#2975;	&#xB9F;	&#3103;	&#xC1F;	&#2847;	&#xB1F;	&#3231;	&#xC9F;	&#3359;	&#xD1F;	&#2719;	&#xA9F;	&#2591;	&#xA1F;
ISCII	189	BD	189	BD	189	BD	189	BD	189	BD	189	BD	189	BD	189	BD	189	BD

Character information
Preview	Ashoka Kushana Gupta						𑌟	
Unicode name	BRAHMI LETTER TTA		KHAROSHTHI LETTER TTA		SIDDHAM LETTER TTA		GRANTHA LETTER TTA	
Encodings	decimal	hex	dec	hex	dec	hex	dec	hex
Unicode	69661	U+1101D	68122	U+10A1A	71064	U+11598	70431	U+1131F
UTF-8	240 145 128 157	F0 91 80 9D	240 144 168 154	F0 90 A8 9A	240 145 150 152	F0 91 96 98	240 145 140 159	F0 91 8C 9F
UTF-16	55300 56349	D804 DC1D	55298 56858	D802 DE1A	55301 56728	D805 DD98	55300 57119	D804 DF1F
Numeric character reference	&#69661;	&#x1101D;	&#68122;	&#x10A1A;	&#71064;	&#x11598;	&#70431;	&#x1131F;

Character information
Preview	ཊ		ྚ		𑨔		𑐚		𑰘		𑆛	
Unicode name	TIBETAN LETTER TTA		TIBETAN SUBJOINED LETTER TTA		ZANABAZAR SQUARE LETTER TTA		NEWA LETTER TTA		BHAIKSUKI LETTER TTA		SHARADA LETTER TTA	
Encodings	decimal	hex	dec	hex	dec	hex	dec	hex	dec	hex	dec	hex
Unicode	3914	U+0F4A	3994	U+0F9A	72212	U+11A14	70682	U+1141A	72728	U+11C18	70043	U+1119B
UTF-8	224 189 138	E0 BD 8A	224 190 154	E0 BE 9A	240 145 168 148	F0 91 A8 94	240 145 144 154	F0 91 90 9A	240 145 176 152	F0 91 B0 98	240 145 134 155	F0 91 86 9B
UTF-16	3914	0F4A	3994	0F9A	55302 56852	D806 DE14	55301 56346	D805 DC1A	55303 56344	D807 DC18	55300 56731	D804 DD9B
Numeric character reference	&#3914;	&#xF4A;	&#3994;	&#xF9A;	&#72212;	&#x11A14;	&#70682;	&#x1141A;	&#72728;	&#x11C18;	&#70043;	&#x1119B;

Character information
Preview	ဋ		ᨭ	
Unicode name	MYANMAR LETTER TTA		TAI THAM LETTER RATA	
Encodings	decimal	hex	dec	hex
Unicode	4107	U+100B	6701	U+1A2D
UTF-8	225 128 139	E1 80 8B	225 168 173	E1 A8 AD
Numeric character reference	&#4107;	&#x100B;	&#6701;	&#x1A2D;

Character information
Preview	ដ		ຏ		ฏ		ฎ	
Unicode name	KHMER LETTER DA		LAO LETTER PALI TTA		THAI CHARACTER TO PATAK		THAI CHARACTER DO CHADA	
Encodings	decimal	hex	dec	hex	dec	hex	dec	hex
Unicode	6026	U+178A	3727	U+0E8F	3599	U+0E0F	3598	U+0E0E
UTF-8	225 158 138	E1 9E 8A	224 186 143	E0 BA 8F	224 184 143	E0 B8 8F	224 184 142	E0 B8 8E
Numeric character reference	&#6026;	&#x178A;	&#3727;	&#xE8F;	&#3599;	&#xE0F;	&#3598;	&#xE0E;

Character information
Preview	ට		𑄑		𑤖		ꢜ	
Unicode name	SINHALA LETTER ALPAPRAANA TTAYANNA		CHAKMA LETTER TTAA		DIVES AKURU LETTER TTA		SAURASHTRA LETTER TTA	
Encodings	decimal	hex	dec	hex	dec	hex	dec	hex
Unicode	3495	U+0DA7	69905	U+11111	71958	U+11916	43164	U+A89C
UTF-8	224 182 167	E0 B6 A7	240 145 132 145	F0 91 84 91	240 145 164 150	F0 91 A4 96	234 162 156	EA A2 9C
UTF-16	3495	0DA7	55300 56593	D804 DD11	55302 56598	D806 DD16	43164	A89C
Numeric character reference	&#3495;	&#xDA7;	&#69905;	&#x11111;	&#71958;	&#x11916;	&#43164;	&#xA89C;

Character information
Preview	𑘘		𑦸		𑩦		ꠐ		𑵽			
Unicode name	MODI LETTER TTA		NANDINAGARI LETTER TTA		SOYOMBO LETTER TTA		SYLOTI NAGRI LETTER TTO		GUNJALA GONDI LETTER TTA		KAITHI LETTER TTA	
Encodings	decimal	hex	dec	hex	dec	hex	dec	hex	dec	hex	dec	hex
Unicode	71192	U+11618	72120	U+119B8	72294	U+11A66	43024	U+A810	73085	U+11D7D	69783	U+11097
UTF-8	240 145 152 152	F0 91 98 98	240 145 166 184	F0 91 A6 B8	240 145 169 166	F0 91 A9 A6	234 160 144	EA A0 90	240 145 181 189	F0 91 B5 BD	240 145 130 151	F0 91 82 97
UTF-16	55301 56856	D805 DE18	55302 56760	D806 DDB8	55302 56934	D806 DE66	43024	A810	55303 56701	D807 DD7D	55300 56471	D804 DC97
Numeric character reference	&#71192;	&#x11618;	&#72120;	&#x119B8;	&#72294;	&#x11A66;	&#43024;	&#xA810;	&#73085;	&#x11D7D;	&#69783;	&#x11097;

Character information
Preview	𑒙	
Unicode name	TIRHUTA LETTER TTA	
Encodings	decimal	hex
Unicode	70809	U+11499
UTF-8	240 145 146 153	F0 91 92 99
UTF-16	55301 56473	D805 DC99
Numeric character reference	&#70809;	&#x11499;

Character information
Preview	𑚔		𑠔		𑋆		𑅞		𑊐	
Unicode name	TAKRI LETTER TTA		DOGRA LETTER TTA		KHUDAWADI LETTER TTA		MAHAJANI LETTER TTA		MULTANI LETTER TTA	
Encodings	decimal	hex	dec	hex	dec	hex	dec	hex	dec	hex
Unicode	71316	U+11694	71700	U+11814	70342	U+112C6	69982	U+1115E	70288	U+11290
UTF-8	240 145 154 148	F0 91 9A 94	240 145 160 148	F0 91 A0 94	240 145 139 134	F0 91 8B 86	240 145 133 158	F0 91 85 9E	240 145 138 144	F0 91 8A 90
UTF-16	55301 56980	D805 DE94	55302 56340	D806 DC14	55300 57030	D804 DEC6	55300 56670	D804 DD5E	55300 56976	D804 DE90
Numeric character reference	&#71316;	&#x11694;	&#71700;	&#x11814;	&#70342;	&#x112C6;	&#69982;	&#x1115E;	&#70288;	&#x11290;

Character information
Preview	ᬝ		ꦛ	
Unicode name	BALINESE LETTER TA LATIK		JAVANESE LETTER TTA	
Encodings	decimal	hex	dec	hex
Unicode	6941	U+1B1D	43419	U+A99B
UTF-8	225 172 157	E1 AC 9D	234 166 155	EA A6 9B
Numeric character reference	&#6941;	&#x1B1D;	&#43419;	&#xA99B;

Character information
Preview	𑴖	
Unicode name	MASARAM GONDI LETTER TTA	
Encodings	decimal	hex
Unicode	72982	U+11D16
UTF-8	240 145 180 150	F0 91 B4 96
UTF-16	55303 56598	D807 DD16
Numeric character reference	&#72982;	&#x11D16;

Character information
Preview	ᑌ		ᑎ		ᑐ		ᑕ		ᑦ	
Unicode name	CANADIAN SYLLABICS TE		CANADIAN SYLLABICS TI		CANADIAN SYLLABICS TO		CANADIAN SYLLABICS TA		CANADIAN SYLLABICS T	
Encodings	decimal	hex	dec	hex	dec	hex	dec	hex	dec	hex
Unicode	5196	U+144C	5198	U+144E	5200	U+1450	5205	U+1455	5222	U+1466
UTF-8	225 145 140	E1 91 8C	225 145 142	E1 91 8E	225 145 144	E1 91 90	225 145 149	E1 91 95	225 145 166	E1 91 A6
Numeric character reference	&#5196;	&#x144C;	&#5198;	&#x144E;	&#5200;	&#x1450;	&#5205;	&#x1455;	&#5222;	&#x1466;

- The full range of E Canadian syllabic characters can be found at the codepoint ranges .
