= Pa (Indic) =

Letter "Pa" in Indic scripts

Example glyphs
- Bengali–Assamese: Pa
- Tibetan: Pa
- Tamil: Pa
- Thai: บ
- Malayalam: പ
- Sinhala: ප
- Ashoka Brahmi: Pa
- Devanagari: Pa

Cognates
- Hebrew: פ ,ף
- Greek: Π
- Latin: P
- Cyrillic: П

Properties
- Phonemic representation: /p/ /ɓ/^{B}
- IAST transliteration: p P
- ISCII code point: C8 (200)
- ^B both /ɓ/ and /p/ in Khmer

Pa is a consonant of Indic abugidas. In modern Indic scripts, Pa is derived from the early "Ashoka" Brahmi letter after having gone through the Gupta letter. The Brahmi letter is probably derived from the Aramaic Pe and is thus related to the modern Latin P and Greek Pi.

== Āryabhaṭa numeration ==
Aryabhata used Devanagari letters for numbers, very similar to the Greek numerals, even after the invention of Indian numerals. The values of the different forms of प are:

- प [pə] = 21 (२१)
- पि [pɪ] = 2,100 (२ १००)
- पु [pʊ] = 210,000 (२ १० ०००)
- पृ [pri] = 21,000,000 (२ १० ०० ०००)
- पॢ [plə] = 21×10^{8} (२१×१०^{८})
- पे [pe] = 21×10^{10} (२१×१०^{१०})
- पै [pɛː] = 21×10^{12} (२१×१०^{१२})
- पो [poː] = 21×10^{14} (२१×१०^{१४})
- पौ [pɔː] = 21×10^{16} (२१×१०^{१६})

== Historic Pa ==
There are three different general early historic scripts - Brahmi and its variants, Kharoṣṭhī, and Tocharian, the so-called slanting Brahmi. Pa as found in standard Brahmi, was a simple geometric shape, with variations toward more flowing forms by the Gupta. The Tocharian Pa had an alternate Fremdzeichen form,. The third form of pa, in Kharoshthi was probably derived from Aramaic separately from the Brahmi letter.

=== Brahmi Pa ===
The Brahmi letter, Pa, is probably derived from the Aramaic Pe, and is thus related to the modern Latin P and Greek Pi. Several identifiable styles of writing the Brahmi Pa can be found, most associated with a specific set of inscriptions from an artifact or diverse records from an historic period. As the earliest and most geometric style of Brahmi, the letters found on the Edicts of Ashoka and other records from around that time are normally the reference form for Brahmi letters, with vowel marks not attested until later forms of Brahmi back-formed to match the geometric writing style.

Brahmi Pa historic forms
Ashoka (3rd-1st c. BCE)	Girnar (~150 BCE)	Kushana (~150-250 CE)	Gujarat (~250 CE)	Gupta (~350 CE)

=== Tocharian Pa ===
The Tocharian letter is derived from the Brahmi, and has an alternate Fremdzeichen form used in conjuncts and as an alternate representation of Pä.

Tocharian Pa with vowel marks
Pa	Pā	Pi	Pī	Pu	Pū	Pr	Pr̄	Pe	Pai	Po	Pau	Pä	Fremdzeichen

=== Kharoṣṭhī Pa ===
The Kharoṣṭhī letter is generally accepted as being derived from the Aramaic Pe, and is thus related to P and Pi, in addition to the Brahmi Pa.

== Devanagari Pa ==
Pa (प) is a consonant of the Devanagari abugida. It ultimately arose from the Brahmi letter, after having gone through the Gupta letter. Letters that derive from it are the Gujarati letter પ, and the Modi letter 𑘢.

=== Devanagari-using Languages ===
In all languages, प is pronounced as [pə] or [p] when appropriate. Like all Indic scripts, Devanagari uses vowel marks attached to the base consonant to override the inherent /ə/ vowel:

Devanagari प with vowel marks
Pa	Pā	Pi	Pī	Pu	Pū	Pr	Pr̄	Pl	Pl̄	Pe	Pai	Po	Pau	P
प	पा	पि	पी	पु	पू	पृ	पॄ	पॢ	पॣ	पे	पै	पो	पौ	प्

=== Conjuncts with प ===
Half form of Pa.

Devanagari exhibits conjunct ligatures, as is common in Indic scripts. In modern Devanagari texts, most conjuncts are formed by reducing the letter shape to fit tightly to the following letter, usually by dropping a character's vertical stem, sometimes referred to as a "half form". Some conjunct clusters are always represented by a true ligature, instead of a shape that can be broken into constituent independent letters. Vertically stacked conjuncts are ubiquitous in older texts, while only a few are still used routinely in modern Devanagari texts. The use of ligatures and vertical conjuncts may vary across languages using the Devanagari script, with Marathi in particular preferring the use of half forms where texts in other languages would show ligatures and vertical stacks.

==== Ligature conjuncts of प ====
True ligatures are quite rare in Indic scripts. The most common ligated conjuncts in Devanagari are in the form of a slight mutation to fit in context or as a consistent variant form appended to the adjacent characters. Those variants include Na and the Repha and Rakar forms of Ra. Nepali and Marathi texts use the "eyelash" Ra half form for an initial "R" instead of repha.

- Repha र্ (r) + प (pa) gives the ligature rpa: ^{note}

- Eyelash र্ (r) + प (pa) gives the ligature rpa:

- प্ (p) + न (na) gives the ligature pna:

- प্ (p) + rakar र (ra) gives the ligature pra:

- प্ (p) + ढ (ḍʱa) gives the ligature pḍʱa:

- प্ (p) + त (ta) gives the ligature pta:

- प্ (p) + त্ (t) + rakar र (ra) gives the ligature ptra:

==== Stacked conjuncts of प ====
Vertically stacked ligatures are the most common conjunct forms found in Devanagari text. Although the constituent characters may need to be stretched and moved slightly in order to stack neatly, stacked conjuncts can be broken down into recognizable base letters, or a letter and an otherwise standard ligature.

- छ্ (c^{h}) + प (pa) gives the ligature c^{h}pa:

- ढ্ (ḍʱ) + प (pa) gives the ligature ḍʱpa:

- ड্ (ḍ) + प (pa) gives the ligature ḍpa:

- द্ (d) + प (pa) gives the ligature dpa:

- ङ্ (ŋ) + प (pa) gives the ligature ŋpa:

- प্ (p) + च (ca) gives the ligature pca:

- प্ (p) + ड (ḍa) gives the ligature pḍa:

- प্ (p) + ज (ja) gives the ligature pja:

- प্ (p) + ज্ (j) + ञ (ña) gives the ligature pjña:

- प্ (p) + ल (la) gives the ligature pla:

- प্ (p) + ङ (ŋa) gives the ligature pŋa:

- प্ (p) + ण (ṇa) gives the ligature pṇa:

- प্ (p) + ञ (ña) gives the ligature pña:

- प্ (p) + ट (ṭa) gives the ligature pṭa:

- प্ (p) + ठ (ṭ^{h}a) gives the ligature pṭ^{h}a:

- ठ্ (ṭ^{h}) + प (pa) gives the ligature ṭ^{h}pa:

- ट্ (ṭ) + प (pa) gives the ligature ṭpa:

== Bengali Pa ==
The Bengali script প is derived from the Siddhaṃ, but lacks the horizontal head line, and has a less geometric shape than its Devanagari counterpart, प. The inherent vowel of Bengali consonant letters is /ɔ/, so the bare letter প will sometimes be transliterated as "po" instead of "pa". Adding okar, the "o" vowel mark, gives a reading of /po/. Like all Indic consonants, প can be modified by marks to indicate another (or no) vowel than its inherent "a".

Bengali প with vowel marks
pa	pā	pi	pī	pu	pū	pr	pr̄	pe	pai	po	pau	p
প	পা	পি	পী	পু	পূ	পৃ	পৄ	পে	পৈ	পো	পৌ	প্

=== প in Bengali-using languages ===
প is used as a basic consonant character in all of the major Bengali script orthographies, including Bengali and Assamese.

=== Conjuncts with প ===
Bengali প exhibits conjunct ligatures, as is common in Indic scripts, with a tendency towards stacked ligatures as an initial head consonant, and linear (horizontal) ligatures as a trailing consonant.

- ল্ (l) + প (pa) gives the ligature lpa:

- ম্ (m) + প (pa) gives the ligature mpa:

- ম্ (m) + প্ (p) + র (ra) gives the ligature mpra, with the ra phala suffix:

- প্ (p) + ল (la) gives the ligature pla:

- প্ (p) + ন (na) gives the ligature pna:

- প্ (p) + প (pa) gives the ligature ppa:

- প্ (p) + র (ra) gives the ligature pra, with the ra phala suffix:

- প্ (p) + র্ (r) + য (ya) gives the ligature prya, with the ra phala and ya phala suffixes

- প্ (p) + স (sa) gives the ligature psa:

- প্ (p) + ত (ta) gives the ligature pta:

- প্ (p) + ট (ṭa) gives the ligature pṭa:

- প্ (p) + য (ya) gives the ligature pya, with the ya phala suffix:

- র্ (r) + প (pa) gives the ligature rpa, with the repha prefix:

- স্ (s) + প (pa) gives the ligature spa:

- স্ (s) + প্ (p) + ল (la) gives the ligature spla:

- ষ্ (ṣ) + প (pa) gives the ligature ṣpa:

- ষ্ (ṣ) + প্ (p) + র (ra) gives the ligature ṣpra, with the ra phala suffix:

== Gujarati Pa ==
Gujarati Pa.

Pa (પ) is the twenty-first consonant of the Gujarati abugida. It is derived from the Devanagari Pa with the top bar (shiro rekha) removed, and ultimately the Brahmi letter.

=== Gujarati-using Languages ===
The Gujarati script is used to write the Gujarati and Kutchi languages. In both languages, પ is pronounced as [pə] or [p] when appropriate. Like all Indic scripts, Gujarati uses vowel marks attached to the base consonant to override the inherent /ə/ vowel:

Pa	Pā	Pi	Pī	Pu	Pū	Pr	Pl	Pr̄	Pl̄	Pĕ	Pe	Pai	Pŏ	Po	Pau	P
Gujarati Pa syllables, with vowel marks in red.

=== Conjuncts with પ ===
Half form of Pa.

Gujarati પ exhibits conjunct ligatures, much like its parent Devanagari Script. Most Gujarati conjuncts can only be formed by reducing the letter shape to fit tightly to the following letter, usually by dropping a character's vertical stem, sometimes referred to as a "half form". A few conjunct clusters can be represented by a true ligature, instead of a shape that can be broken into constituent independent letters, and vertically stacked conjuncts can also be found in Gujarati, although much less commonly than in Devanagari. True ligatures are quite rare in Indic scripts. The most common ligated conjuncts in Gujarati are in the form of a slight mutation to fit in context or as a consistent variant form appended to the adjacent characters. Those variants include Na and the Repha and Rakar forms of Ra.

- ર્ (r) + પ (pa) gives the ligature RPa:

- પ્ (p) + ર (ra) gives the ligature PRa:

- પ્ (p) + ત (ta) gives the ligature PTa:

- પ્ (p) + ન (na) gives the ligature PNa:

== Telugu Pa ==
Telugu independent and subjoined Pa.

Pa (ప) is a consonant of the Telugu abugida. It ultimately arose from the Brahmi letter. It is closely related to the Kannada letter ಪ. Most Telugu consonants contain a v-shaped headstroke that is related to the horizontal headline found in other Indic scripts, although headstrokes do not connect adjacent letters in Telugu. The headstroke is normally lost when adding vowel matras. Telugu conjuncts are created by reducing trailing letters to a subjoined form that appears below the initial consonant of the conjunct. Many subjoined forms are created by dropping their headline, with many extending the end of the stroke of the main letter body to form an extended tail reaching up to the right of the preceding consonant. This subjoining of trailing letters to create conjuncts is in contrast to the leading half forms of Devanagari and Bengali letters. Ligature conjuncts are not a feature in Telugu, with the only non-standard construction being an alternate subjoined form of Ṣa (borrowed from Kannada) in the KṢa conjunct.

== Malayalam Pa ==
Malayalam letter Pa

Pa (പ) is a consonant of the Malayalam abugida. It ultimately arose from the Brahmi letter, via the Grantha letter Pa. Like in other Indic scripts, Malayalam consonants have the inherent vowel "a", and take one of several modifying vowel signs to represent syllables with another vowel or no vowel at all.

Malayalam Pa matras: Pa, Pā, Pi, Pī, Pu, Pū, Pr̥, Pr̥̄, Pl̥, Pl̥̄, Pe, Pē, Pai, Po, Pō, Pau, and P.

=== Conjuncts of പ ===
As is common in Indic scripts, Malayalam joins letters together to form conjunct consonant clusters. There are several ways in which conjuncts are formed in Malayalam texts: using a post-base form of a trailing consonant placed under the initial consonant of a conjunct, a combined ligature of two or more consonants joined together, a conjoining form that appears as a combining mark on the rest of the conjunct, the use of an explicit candrakkala mark to suppress the inherent "a" vowel, or a special consonant form called a "chillu" letter, representing a bare consonant without the inherent "a" vowel. Texts written with the modern reformed Malayalam orthography, put̪iya lipi, may favor more regular conjunct forms than older texts in paḻaya lipi, due to changes undertaken in the 1970s by the Government of Kerala.

- പ് (p) + ത (ta) gives the ligature pta:

- പ് (p) + ന (na) gives the ligature pna:

- പ് (p) + പ (pa) gives the ligature ppa:

- മ് (m) + പ (pa) gives the ligature mpa:

- ല് (l) + പ (pa) gives the ligature lpa:

- ഷ് (ṣ) + പ (pa) gives the ligature ṣpa:

- സ് (s) + പ (pa) gives the ligature spa:

- പ് (p) + ഫ (p^{h}a) gives the ligature pp^{h}a:

- പ് (p) + സ (sa) gives the ligature psa:

== Canadian Aboriginal Syllabics Pe ==
ᐯ, ᐱ, ᐳ and ᐸ are the base characters "Pe", "Pi", "Po" and "Pa" in the Canadian Aboriginal Syllabics. The bare consonant ᑉ (P) is a small version of the A-series letter ᐸ, although the Western Cree letter ᑊ, derived from Pitman shorthand was the original bare consonant symbol for P. The character ᐯ is derived from a handwritten form of the Devanagari letter प, without the headline or vertical stem, and the forms for different vowels are derived by rotation. Unlike most writing systems without legacy computer encodings, complex Canadian syllabic letters are represented in Unicode with pre-composed characters, rather than with base characters and diacritical marks.

Variant	E-series		I-series		O-series		A-series			Other
P + vowel	ᐯ		ᐱ		ᐳ		ᐸ			ᢵ
P + vowel	Pe		Pi		Po		Pa			Pay
Small	-		ᣔ		-		ᑉ			ᑊ
Small	-		Ojibway P		-		P			Cree P
P with long vowels	-		ᐲ		ᐴ	ᐵ	ᐹ			ᐰ
P with long vowels	-		Pī		Pō	Cree Pō	Pā			Pāi
P + W-vowels	ᐺ	ᐻ	ᐼ	ᐽ	ᑀ	ᑁ	ᑄ	ᑅ		-
P + W-vowels	Pwe	Cree Pwe	Pwi	Cree Pwi	Pwo	Cree Pwo	Pwa	Cree Pwa		-
P + long W-vowels	-		ᐾ	ᐿ	ᑂ	ᑃ	ᑆ	ᑇ	ᑈ	-
P + long W-vowels	-		Pwī	Cree Pwī	Pwō	Cree Pwō	Pwā	Cree Pwā		-
Other P forms	-		-		ᢴ	ᢶ	-			-
Other P forms	-		-		Poy	Pwoy	-			-

== Odia Pa ==
Odia independent and subjoined letter Pa.

Pa (ପ) is a consonant of the Odia abugida. It ultimately arose from the Brahmi letter, via the Siddhaṃ letter Pa. Like in other Indic scripts, Odia consonants have the inherent vowel "a", and take one of several modifying vowel signs to represent syllables with another vowel or no vowel at all.

Odia Pa with vowel matras
Pa	Pā	Pi	Pī	Pu	Pū	Pr̥	Pr̥̄	Pl̥	Pl̥̄	Pe	Pai	Po	Pau	P
ପ	ପା	ପି	ପୀ	ପୁ	ପୂ	ପୃ	ପୄ	ପୢ	ପୣ	ପେ	ପୈ	ପୋ	ପୌ	ପ୍

=== Conjuncts of ପ ===
As is common in Indic scripts, Odia joins letters together to form conjunct consonant clusters. The most common conjunct formation is achieved by using a small subjoined form of trailing consonants. Most consonants' subjoined forms are identical to the full form, just reduced in size, although a few drop the curved headline or have a subjoined form not directly related to the full form of the consonant. The second type of conjunct formation is through pure ligatures, where the constituent consonants are written together in a single graphic form. This ligature may be recognizable as being a combination of two characters or it can have a conjunct ligature unrelated to its constituent characters.

- ମ୍ (m) + ପ (pa) gives the ligature mpa:

== Kaithi Pa ==
Kaithi consonant and half-form Pa.

Pa (𑂣) is a consonant of the Kaithi abugida. It ultimately arose from the Brahmi letter, via the Siddhaṃ letter Pa. Like in other Indic scripts, Kaithi consonants have the inherent vowel "a", and take one of several modifying vowel signs to represent syllables with another vowel or no vowel at all.

Kaithi Pa with vowel matras
Pa	Pā	Pi	Pī	Pu	Pū	Pe	Pai	Po	Pau	P
𑂣	𑂣𑂰	𑂣𑂱	𑂣𑂲	𑂣𑂳	𑂣𑂴	𑂣𑂵	𑂣𑂶	𑂣𑂷	𑂣𑂸	𑂣𑂹

=== Conjuncts of 𑂣 ===
As is common in Indic scripts, Kaithi joins letters together to form conjunct consonant clusters. The most common conjunct formation is achieved by using a half form of preceding consonants, although several consonants use an explicit virama. Most half forms are derived from the full form by removing the vertical stem. As is common in most Indic scripts, conjuncts of ra are indicated with a repha or rakar mark attached to the rest of the consonant cluster. In addition, there are a few vertical conjuncts that can be found in Kaithi writing, but true ligatures are not used in the modern Kaithi script.

- 𑂣୍ (p) + 𑂩 (ra) gives the ligature pra:

- 𑂩୍ (r) + 𑂣 (pa) gives the ligature rpa:

== Tirhuta Pa ==
Tirhuta consonant Pa

Pa (𑒣) is a consonant of the Tirhuta abugida. It ultimately arose from the Brahmi letter, via the Siddhaṃ letter Pa. Like in other Indic scripts, Tirhuta consonants have the inherent vowel "a", and take one of several modifying vowel signs to represent sylables with another vowel or no vowel at all.

Tirhuta Pa with vowel matras
Pa	Pā	Pi	Pī	Pu	Pū	Pṛ	Pṝ	Pḷ	Pḹ	Pē	Pe	Pai	Pō	Po	Pau	P
𑒣	𑒣𑒰	𑒣𑒱	𑒣𑒲	𑒣𑒳	𑒣𑒴	𑒣𑒵	𑒣𑒶	𑒣𑒷	𑒣𑒸	𑒣𑒹	𑒣𑒺	𑒣𑒻	𑒣𑒼	𑒣𑒽	𑒣𑒾	𑒣𑓂

=== Conjuncts of 𑒣 ===
As is common in Indic scripts, Tirhuta joins letters together to form conjunct consonant clusters. The most common conjunct formation is achieved by using an explicit virama. As is common in most Indic scripts, conjuncts of ra are indicated with a repha or rakar mark attached to the rest of the consonant cluster. In addition, other consonants take unique combining forms when in conjunct with other letters, and there are several vertical conjuncts and true ligatures that can be found in Tirhuta writing.

- 𑒣୍ (p) + 𑒩 (ra) gives the ligature pra:

- 𑒣 (p) + 𑒅 (u) gives the ligature pu:

- 𑒣୍ (p) + 𑒫 (va) gives the ligature pva:

- 𑒩୍ (r) + 𑒣 (pa) gives the ligature rpa:

- 𑒞୍ (t) + 𑒣 (pa) gives the ligature tpa:

== Comparison of Pa ==
The various Indic scripts are generally related to each other through adaptation and borrowing, and as such the glyphs for cognate letters, including Pa, are related as well.

Comparison of Pa in different scripts

Aramaic
Kharoṣṭhī 𐨤	Ashoka Brahmi	Kushana Brahmi (Note: The middle "Kushana" form of Brahmi is a later style that emerged as Brahmi scripts were beginning to proliferate. Gupta Brahmi was definitely a stylistic descendant from Kushana, but other Brahmi-derived scripts may have descended from earlier forms.)	Tocharian (Note: Tocharian is probably derived from the middle period "Kushana" form of Brahmi, although artifacts from that time are not plentiful enough to establish a definite succession.) /
Gupta Brahmi	Pallava
Kadamba -
Bhaiksuki 𑰢	Siddhaṃ	Grantha 𑌪	Cham ꨚ
Sinhala ප	Pyu / Old Mon (Note: Pyu and Old Mon are probably the precursors of the Burmese script, and may be derived from either the Pallava or Kadamba script) -
Tibetan	Newa 𑐥	Ahom 𑜆	Malayalam പ
Telugu ప	Burmese ပ
Lepcha ᰎ	Ranjana	Saurashtra ꢦ	Dives Akuru 𑤠
Kannada ಪ	Kayah Li ꤕ
Limbu ᤐ	Soyombo (Note: May also be derived from Devangari (see bottom left of table)) 𑩰	Khmer ប	Tamil
Chakma 𑄛	Tai Tham ᨷ / ᨸ
Meitei Mayek ꯄ	Gaudi -	Thai บ / ป	Lao ບ / ປ
Tai Le ᥙ
Marchen 𑱾	Tirhuta 𑒣	New Tai Lue ᦢ / ᦔ	Tai Viet ꪜ / ꪝ	Aksara Kawi
'Phags-pa ꡌ	Odia ପ	Sharada 𑆥	Rejang ꤶ	Batak ᯇ	Buginese ᨄ
Zanabazar Square 𑨞	Bengali–Assamese	Takri 𑚞	Javanese ꦥ	Balinese ᬧ	Makasar 𑻣
Hangul (Note: The Origin of Hangul from 'Phags-pa is one of limited influence, inspiring at most a few basic letter shapes. Hangul does not function as an Indic abugida.) -	Northern Nagari -	Dogri 𑠞	Laṇḍā -	Sundanese ᮕ	Baybayin ᜉ
Modi 𑘢	Gujarati પ	Khojki 𑈟	Khudabadi 𑋒	Mahajani 𑅨	Tagbanwa ᝩ
Devanagari	Nandinagari 𑧂	Kaithi	Gurmukhi ਪ	Multani 𑊛	Buhid ᝉ
Canadian Syllabics (Note: Although the basic letter forms of the Canadian Aboriginal Syllabics were derived from handwritten Devanagari letters, this abugida indicates vowel sounds by rotations of the letter form, rather than the use of vowel diacritics as is standard in Indic abugidas.) ᐯ	Soyombo (Note: May also be derived from Ranjana (see above)) 𑩰	Sylheti Nagari ꠙ	Gunjala Gondi 𑶅	Masaram Gondi (Note: Masaram Gondi acts as an Indic abugida, but its letterforms were not derived from any single precursor script.) 𑴠	Hanuno'o ᜩ

== Character encodings of Pa ==
Most Indic scripts are encoded in the Unicode Standard, and as such the letter Pa in those scripts can be represented in plain text with unique codepoint. Pa from several modern-use scripts can also be found in legacy encodings, such as ISCII.

Character information
Preview							ప		ପ		ಪ		പ		પ		ਪ	
Unicode name	DEVANAGARI LETTER PA		BENGALI LETTER PA		TAMIL LETTER PA		TELUGU LETTER PA		ORIYA LETTER PA		KANNADA LETTER PA		MALAYALAM LETTER PA		GUJARATI LETTER PA		GURMUKHI LETTER PA	
Encodings	decimal	hex	dec	hex	dec	hex	dec	hex	dec	hex	dec	hex	dec	hex	dec	hex	dec	hex
Unicode	2346	U+092A	2474	U+09AA	2986	U+0BAA	3114	U+0C2A	2858	U+0B2A	3242	U+0CAA	3370	U+0D2A	2730	U+0AAA	2602	U+0A2A
UTF-8	224 164 170	E0 A4 AA	224 166 170	E0 A6 AA	224 174 170	E0 AE AA	224 176 170	E0 B0 AA	224 172 170	E0 AC AA	224 178 170	E0 B2 AA	224 180 170	E0 B4 AA	224 170 170	E0 AA AA	224 168 170	E0 A8 AA
Numeric character reference	&#2346;	&#x92A;	&#2474;	&#x9AA;	&#2986;	&#xBAA;	&#3114;	&#xC2A;	&#2858;	&#xB2A;	&#3242;	&#xCAA;	&#3370;	&#xD2A;	&#2730;	&#xAAA;	&#2602;	&#xA2A;
ISCII	200	C8	200	C8	200	C8	200	C8	200	C8	200	C8	200	C8	200	C8	200	C8

Character information
Preview	Ashoka Kushana Gupta		𐨤				𑌪	
Unicode name	BRAHMI LETTER PA		KHAROSHTHI LETTER PA		SIDDHAM LETTER PA		GRANTHA LETTER PA	
Encodings	decimal	hex	dec	hex	dec	hex	dec	hex
Unicode	69671	U+11027	68132	U+10A24	71074	U+115A2	70442	U+1132A
UTF-8	240 145 128 167	F0 91 80 A7	240 144 168 164	F0 90 A8 A4	240 145 150 162	F0 91 96 A2	240 145 140 170	F0 91 8C AA
UTF-16	55300 56359	D804 DC27	55298 56868	D802 DE24	55301 56738	D805 DDA2	55300 57130	D804 DF2A
Numeric character reference	&#69671;	&#x11027;	&#68132;	&#x10A24;	&#71074;	&#x115A2;	&#70442;	&#x1132A;

Character information
Preview			ྤ		ꡌ		𑨞		𑐥		𑰢		𑆥	
Unicode name	TIBETAN LETTER PA		TIBETAN SUBJOINED LETTER PA		PHAGS-PA LETTER PA		ZANABAZAR SQUARE LETTER PA		NEWA LETTER PA		BHAIKSUKI LETTER PA		SHARADA LETTER PA	
Encodings	decimal	hex	dec	hex	dec	hex	dec	hex	dec	hex	dec	hex	dec	hex
Unicode	3924	U+0F54	4004	U+0FA4	43084	U+A84C	72222	U+11A1E	70693	U+11425	72738	U+11C22	70053	U+111A5
UTF-8	224 189 148	E0 BD 94	224 190 164	E0 BE A4	234 161 140	EA A1 8C	240 145 168 158	F0 91 A8 9E	240 145 144 165	F0 91 90 A5	240 145 176 162	F0 91 B0 A2	240 145 134 165	F0 91 86 A5
UTF-16	3924	0F54	4004	0FA4	43084	A84C	55302 56862	D806 DE1E	55301 56357	D805 DC25	55303 56354	D807 DC22	55300 56741	D804 DDA5
Numeric character reference	&#3924;	&#xF54;	&#4004;	&#xFA4;	&#43084;	&#xA84C;	&#72222;	&#x11A1E;	&#70693;	&#x11425;	&#72738;	&#x11C22;	&#70053;	&#x111A5;

Character information
Preview	ပ	
Unicode name	MYANMAR LETTER PA	
Encodings	decimal	hex
Unicode	4117	U+1015
UTF-8	225 128 149	E1 80 95
Numeric character reference	&#4117;	&#x1015;

- See further below for Tai Tham and New Tai Lue codepoints.

Character information
Preview	ប		ບ		ປ		บ		ป		ꪜ		ꪝ	
Unicode name	KHMER LETTER BA		LAO LETTER BO		LAO LETTER PO		THAI CHARACTER BO BAIMAI		THAI CHARACTER PO PLA		TAI VIET LETTER LOW PO		TAI VIET LETTER HIGH PO	
Encodings	decimal	hex	dec	hex	dec	hex	dec	hex	dec	hex	dec	hex	dec	hex
Unicode	6036	U+1794	3738	U+0E9A	3739	U+0E9B	3610	U+0E1A	3611	U+0E1B	43676	U+AA9C	43677	U+AA9D
UTF-8	225 158 148	E1 9E 94	224 186 154	E0 BA 9A	224 186 155	E0 BA 9B	224 184 154	E0 B8 9A	224 184 155	E0 B8 9B	234 170 156	EA AA 9C	234 170 157	EA AA 9D
Numeric character reference	&#6036;	&#x1794;	&#3738;	&#xE9A;	&#3739;	&#xE9B;	&#3610;	&#xE1A;	&#3611;	&#xE1B;	&#43676;	&#xAA9C;	&#43677;	&#xAA9D;

Character information
Preview	ප		ꤕ		𑄛		ᥙ		𑜆		𑤠		ꢦ		ꨚ	
Unicode name	SINHALA LETTER ALPAPRAANA PAYANNA		KAYAH LI LETTER PA		CHAKMA LETTER PAA		TAI LE LETTER PA		AHOM LETTER PA		DIVES AKURU LETTER PA		SAURASHTRA LETTER PA		CHAM LETTER PA	
Encodings	decimal	hex	dec	hex	dec	hex	dec	hex	dec	hex	dec	hex	dec	hex	dec	hex
Unicode	3508	U+0DB4	43285	U+A915	69915	U+1111B	6489	U+1959	71430	U+11706	71968	U+11920	43174	U+A8A6	43546	U+AA1A
UTF-8	224 182 180	E0 B6 B4	234 164 149	EA A4 95	240 145 132 155	F0 91 84 9B	225 165 153	E1 A5 99	240 145 156 134	F0 91 9C 86	240 145 164 160	F0 91 A4 A0	234 162 166	EA A2 A6	234 168 154	EA A8 9A
UTF-16	3508	0DB4	43285	A915	55300 56603	D804 DD1B	6489	1959	55301 57094	D805 DF06	55302 56608	D806 DD20	43174	A8A6	43546	AA1A
Numeric character reference	&#3508;	&#xDB4;	&#43285;	&#xA915;	&#69915;	&#x1111B;	&#6489;	&#x1959;	&#71430;	&#x11706;	&#71968;	&#x11920;	&#43174;	&#xA8A6;	&#43546;	&#xAA1A;

Character information
Preview	𑘢		𑧂		𑩰		ꠙ		𑶅			
Unicode name	MODI LETTER PA		NANDINAGARI LETTER PA		SOYOMBO LETTER PA		SYLOTI NAGRI LETTER PO		GUNJALA GONDI LETTER PA		KAITHI LETTER PA	
Encodings	decimal	hex	dec	hex	dec	hex	dec	hex	dec	hex	dec	hex
Unicode	71202	U+11622	72130	U+119C2	72304	U+11A70	43033	U+A819	73093	U+11D85	69795	U+110A3
UTF-8	240 145 152 162	F0 91 98 A2	240 145 167 130	F0 91 A7 82	240 145 169 176	F0 91 A9 B0	234 160 153	EA A0 99	240 145 182 133	F0 91 B6 85	240 145 130 163	F0 91 82 A3
UTF-16	55301 56866	D805 DE22	55302 56770	D806 DDC2	55302 56944	D806 DE70	43033	A819	55303 56709	D807 DD85	55300 56483	D804 DCA3
Numeric character reference	&#71202;	&#x11622;	&#72130;	&#x119C2;	&#72304;	&#x11A70;	&#43033;	&#xA819;	&#73093;	&#x11D85;	&#69795;	&#x110A3;

Character information
Preview	𑒣		ᰎ		ᤐ		ꯄ		𑱾	
Unicode name	TIRHUTA LETTER PA		LEPCHA LETTER PA		LIMBU LETTER PA		MEETEI MAYEK LETTER PA		MARCHEN LETTER PA	
Encodings	decimal	hex	dec	hex	dec	hex	dec	hex	dec	hex
Unicode	70819	U+114A3	7182	U+1C0E	6416	U+1910	43972	U+ABC4	72830	U+11C7E
UTF-8	240 145 146 163	F0 91 92 A3	225 176 142	E1 B0 8E	225 164 144	E1 A4 90	234 175 132	EA AF 84	240 145 177 190	F0 91 B1 BE
UTF-16	55301 56483	D805 DCA3	7182	1C0E	6416	1910	43972	ABC4	55303 56446	D807 DC7E
Numeric character reference	&#70819;	&#x114A3;	&#7182;	&#x1C0E;	&#6416;	&#x1910;	&#43972;	&#xABC4;	&#72830;	&#x11C7E;

Character information
Preview	𑚞		𑠞		𑈟		𑋒		𑅨		𑊛	
Unicode name	TAKRI LETTER PA		DOGRA LETTER PA		KHOJKI LETTER PA		KHUDAWADI LETTER PA		MAHAJANI LETTER PA		MULTANI LETTER PA	
Encodings	decimal	hex	dec	hex	dec	hex	dec	hex	dec	hex	dec	hex
Unicode	71326	U+1169E	71710	U+1181E	70175	U+1121F	70354	U+112D2	69992	U+11168	70299	U+1129B
UTF-8	240 145 154 158	F0 91 9A 9E	240 145 160 158	F0 91 A0 9E	240 145 136 159	F0 91 88 9F	240 145 139 146	F0 91 8B 92	240 145 133 168	F0 91 85 A8	240 145 138 155	F0 91 8A 9B
UTF-16	55301 56990	D805 DE9E	55302 56350	D806 DC1E	55300 56863	D804 DE1F	55300 57042	D804 DED2	55300 56680	D804 DD68	55300 56987	D804 DE9B
Numeric character reference	&#71326;	&#x1169E;	&#71710;	&#x1181E;	&#70175;	&#x1121F;	&#70354;	&#x112D2;	&#69992;	&#x11168;	&#70299;	&#x1129B;

Character information
Preview	ᬧ		ᯇ		ᨄ		ꦥ		𑻣		ꤶ		ᮕ	
Unicode name	BALINESE LETTER PA		BATAK LETTER PA		BUGINESE LETTER PA		JAVANESE LETTER PA		MAKASAR LETTER PA		REJANG LETTER PA		SUNDANESE LETTER PA	
Encodings	decimal	hex	dec	hex	dec	hex	dec	hex	dec	hex	dec	hex	dec	hex
Unicode	6951	U+1B27	7111	U+1BC7	6660	U+1A04	43429	U+A9A5	73443	U+11EE3	43318	U+A936	7061	U+1B95
UTF-8	225 172 167	E1 AC A7	225 175 135	E1 AF 87	225 168 132	E1 A8 84	234 166 165	EA A6 A5	240 145 187 163	F0 91 BB A3	234 164 182	EA A4 B6	225 174 149	E1 AE 95
UTF-16	6951	1B27	7111	1BC7	6660	1A04	43429	A9A5	55303 57059	D807 DEE3	43318	A936	7061	1B95
Numeric character reference	&#6951;	&#x1B27;	&#7111;	&#x1BC7;	&#6660;	&#x1A04;	&#43429;	&#xA9A5;	&#73443;	&#x11EE3;	&#43318;	&#xA936;	&#7061;	&#x1B95;

Character information
Preview	ᜉ		ᝩ		ᝉ		ᜩ		𑴠	
Unicode name	TAGALOG LETTER PA		TAGBANWA LETTER PA		BUHID LETTER PA		HANUNOO LETTER PA		MASARAM GONDI LETTER PA	
Encodings	decimal	hex	dec	hex	dec	hex	dec	hex	dec	hex
Unicode	5897	U+1709	5993	U+1769	5961	U+1749	5929	U+1729	72992	U+11D20
UTF-8	225 156 137	E1 9C 89	225 157 169	E1 9D A9	225 157 137	E1 9D 89	225 156 169	E1 9C A9	240 145 180 160	F0 91 B4 A0
UTF-16	5897	1709	5993	1769	5961	1749	5929	1729	55303 56608	D807 DD20
Numeric character reference	&#5897;	&#x1709;	&#5993;	&#x1769;	&#5961;	&#x1749;	&#5929;	&#x1729;	&#72992;	&#x11D20;

Character information
Preview	ᐯ		ᐱ		ᐳ		ᐸ		ᑉ	
Unicode name	CANADIAN SYLLABICS PE		CANADIAN SYLLABICS PI		CANADIAN SYLLABICS PO		CANADIAN SYLLABICS PA		CANADIAN SYLLABICS P	
Encodings	decimal	hex	dec	hex	dec	hex	dec	hex	dec	hex
Unicode	5167	U+142F	5169	U+1431	5171	U+1433	5176	U+1438	5193	U+1449
UTF-8	225 144 175	E1 90 AF	225 144 177	E1 90 B1	225 144 179	E1 90 B3	225 144 184	E1 90 B8	225 145 137	E1 91 89
Numeric character reference	&#5167;	&#x142F;	&#5169;	&#x1431;	&#5171;	&#x1433;	&#5176;	&#x1438;	&#5193;	&#x1449;

- The full range of pE Canadian syllabic characters can be found at the codepoint ranges 142F-1449, 150C, 18B4-18B6, 14D4, & 18DC-18DD.

Character information
Preview	ᨷ		ᩝ		ᨸ		ᦢ		ᦥ		ᧇ		ᦔ	
Unicode name	TAI THAM LETTER BA		TAI THAM CONSONANT SIGN BA		TAI THAM LETTER HIGH PA		NEW TAI LUE LETTER HIGH BA		NEW TAI LUE LETTER LOW BA		NEW TAI LUE LETTER FINAL B		NEW TAI LUE LETTER HIGH PA	
Encodings	decimal	hex	dec	hex	dec	hex	dec	hex	dec	hex	dec	hex	dec	hex
Unicode	6711	U+1A37	6749	U+1A5D	6712	U+1A38	6562	U+19A2	6565	U+19A5	6599	U+19C7	6548	U+1994
UTF-8	225 168 183	E1 A8 B7	225 169 157	E1 A9 9D	225 168 184	E1 A8 B8	225 166 162	E1 A6 A2	225 166 165	E1 A6 A5	225 167 135	E1 A7 87	225 166 148	E1 A6 94
Numeric character reference	&#6711;	&#x1A37;	&#6749;	&#x1A5D;	&#6712;	&#x1A38;	&#6562;	&#x19A2;	&#6565;	&#x19A5;	&#6599;	&#x19C7;	&#6548;	&#x1994;
