= TextAmerica =

- TextAmerica's homepage in 2005
- Website type: Mobile blogging
- Founded: 2002
- Dissolved: 2007
- Headquarters: San Diego
- Founder: Chris Hoar
- Website: textamerica.com
- Current status: Defunct

TextAmerica (TA) was one of the first online photo album or moblog sites that allowed users to upload pictures directly from a digital camera or camera phone or images manipulated with photo editing software to a personal page. Users could also send their videos directly from their mobile phones.

TextAmerica launched as a moblogging site in 2002, after spinning off from a telecommunications marketing company. Chris Hoar was the founder and vice president for marketing of TextAmerica. The company was based out of San Diego. By 2003, around 100 images were being uploaded per day. By 2004, TextAmerica had some 100,000 moblogs and 500,000 users, and by 2005 was the largest moblog company in the United States. A group of users calling themselves the "TA Mafia" would tag accounts of underage members.

Originally a free site, TextAmerica began charging membership fees in July 2006, and deleting content uploaded to old free accounts some months after that. It closed in December 2007. The domain name is now being used by a different company and service.
