= Ta (Javanese) =

- ꦠ
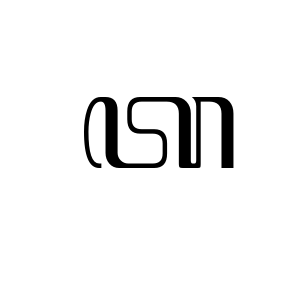
- Aksara nglegena

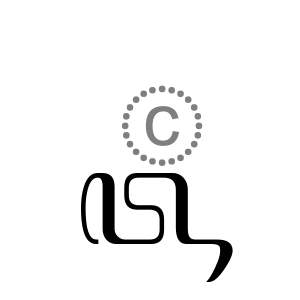
- Aksara pasangan

Usage
- Writing system: Javanese script
- Latin orthography: ta
- Sound values: [t̪]
- In Unicode: A9A0

ꦠ is a syllable in the Javanese script that represents the sounds /t̪ɔ/ and /t̪a/. It is transliterated to Latin as "ta", and sometimes in Indonesian orthography as "to". It has two other forms (pasangan), which are ◌꧀ꦠ and ◌꧀ꦠꦸ (if followed by 'ꦸ' and several other glyphs), but represented by a single Unicode code point, U+A9A0.

== Pasangan ==
Its pasangan form ◌꧀ꦠ, is located on the bottom side of the previous syllable. For example, ꦥꦼꦝꦺꦠ꧀ꦠꦺ - pedhete (his/her buffalo), which, although transliterated with a single 't', is written using double 'ꦠ' because the root word ('pedhet', buffalo) ends in 'ꦠ'.

The pasangan has two forms, the other is used when the pasangan is followed by 'ꦸ', 'ꦹ', 'ꦿ', 'ꦽ', or 'ꦾ'. For example, ꦲꦤꦏ꧀ꦠꦸꦩ - anak tuma (little flea)

== Murda ==
The letter ꦠ has a murda form, which is ꦡ.

== Glyphs ==
Nglegena forms				Pasangan forms			
ꦠ ta	ꦠꦃ tah	ꦠꦁ tang	ꦠꦂ tar	◌꧀ꦠ -ta	◌꧀ꦠꦃ -tah	◌꧀ꦠꦁ -tang	◌꧀ꦠꦂ -tar
ꦠꦺ te	ꦠꦺꦃ teh	ꦠꦺꦁ teng	ꦠꦺꦂ ter	◌꧀ꦠꦺ -te	◌꧀ꦠꦺꦃ -teh	◌꧀ꦠꦺꦁ -teng	◌꧀ꦠꦺꦂ -ter
ꦠꦼ tê	ꦠꦼꦃ têh	ꦠꦼꦁ têng	ꦠꦼꦂ têr	◌꧀ꦠꦼ -tê	◌꧀ꦠꦼꦃ -têh	◌꧀ꦠꦼꦁ -têng	◌꧀ꦠꦼꦂ -têr
ꦠꦶ ti	ꦠꦶꦃ tih	ꦠꦶꦁ ting	ꦠꦶꦂ tir	◌꧀ꦠꦶ -ti	◌꧀ꦠꦶꦃ -tih	◌꧀ꦠꦶꦁ -ting	◌꧀ꦠꦶꦂ -tir
ꦠꦺꦴ to	ꦠꦺꦴꦃ toh	ꦠꦺꦴꦁ tong	ꦠꦺꦴꦂ tor	◌꧀ꦠꦺꦴ -to	◌꧀ꦠꦺꦴꦃ -toh	◌꧀ꦠꦺꦴꦁ -tong	◌꧀ꦠꦺꦴꦂ -tor
ꦠꦸ tu	ꦠꦸꦃ tuh	ꦠꦸꦁ tung	ꦠꦸꦂ tur	◌꧀ꦠꦸ -tu	◌꧀ꦠꦸꦃ -tuh	◌꧀ꦠꦸꦁ -tung	◌꧀ꦠꦸꦂ -tur
ꦠꦿ tra	ꦠꦿꦃ trah	ꦠꦿꦁ trang	ꦠꦿꦂ trar	◌꧀ꦠꦿ -tra	◌꧀ꦠꦿꦃ -trah	◌꧀ꦠꦿꦁ -trang	◌꧀ꦠꦿꦂ -trar
ꦠꦿꦺ tre	ꦠꦿꦺꦃ treh	ꦠꦿꦺꦁ treng	ꦠꦿꦺꦂ trer	◌꧀ꦠꦿꦺ -tre	◌꧀ꦠꦿꦺꦃ -treh	◌꧀ꦠꦿꦺꦁ -treng	◌꧀ꦠꦿꦺꦂ -trer
ꦠꦽ trê	ꦠꦽꦃ trêh	ꦠꦽꦁ trêng	ꦠꦽꦂ trêr	◌꧀ꦠꦽ -trê	◌꧀ꦠꦽꦃ -trêh	◌꧀ꦠꦽꦁ -trêng	◌꧀ꦠꦽꦂ -trêr
ꦠꦿꦶ tri	ꦠꦿꦶꦃ trih	ꦠꦿꦶꦁ tring	ꦠꦿꦶꦂ trir	◌꧀ꦠꦿꦶ -tri	◌꧀ꦠꦿꦶꦃ -trih	◌꧀ꦠꦿꦶꦁ -tring	◌꧀ꦠꦿꦶꦂ -trir
ꦠꦿꦺꦴ tro	ꦠꦿꦺꦴꦃ troh	ꦠꦿꦺꦴꦁ trong	ꦠꦿꦺꦴꦂ tror	◌꧀ꦠꦿꦺꦴ -tro	◌꧀ꦠꦿꦺꦴꦃ -troh	◌꧀ꦠꦿꦺꦴꦁ -trong	◌꧀ꦠꦿꦺꦴꦂ -tror
ꦠꦿꦸ tru	ꦠꦿꦸꦃ truh	ꦠꦿꦸꦁ trung	ꦠꦿꦸꦂ trur	◌꧀ꦠꦿꦸ -tru	◌꧀ꦠꦿꦸꦃ -truh	◌꧀ꦠꦿꦸꦁ -trung	◌꧀ꦠꦿꦸꦂ -trur
ꦠꦾ tya	ꦠꦾꦃ tyah	ꦠꦾꦁ tyang	ꦠꦾꦂ tyar	◌꧀ꦠꦾ -tya	◌꧀ꦠꦾꦃ -tyah	◌꧀ꦠꦾꦁ -tyang	◌꧀ꦠꦾꦂ -tyar
ꦠꦾꦺ tye	ꦠꦾꦺꦃ tyeh	ꦠꦾꦺꦁ tyeng	ꦠꦾꦺꦂ tyer	◌꧀ꦠꦾꦺ -tye	◌꧀ꦠꦾꦺꦃ -tyeh	◌꧀ꦠꦾꦺꦁ -tyeng	◌꧀ꦠꦾꦺꦂ -tyer
ꦠꦾꦼ tyê	ꦠꦾꦼꦃ tyêh	ꦠꦾꦼꦁ tyêng	ꦠꦾꦼꦂ tyêr	◌꧀ꦠꦾꦼ -tyê	◌꧀ꦠꦾꦼꦃ -tyêh	◌꧀ꦠꦾꦼꦁ -tyêng	◌꧀ꦠꦾꦼꦂ -tyêr
ꦠꦾꦶ tyi	ꦠꦾꦶꦃ tyih	ꦠꦾꦶꦁ tying	ꦠꦾꦶꦂ tyir	◌꧀ꦠꦾꦶ -tyi	◌꧀ꦠꦾꦶꦃ -tyih	◌꧀ꦠꦾꦶꦁ -tying	◌꧀ꦠꦾꦶꦂ -tyir
ꦠꦾꦺꦴ tyo	ꦠꦾꦺꦴꦃ tyoh	ꦠꦾꦺꦴꦁ tyong	ꦠꦾꦺꦴꦂ tyor	◌꧀ꦠꦾꦺꦴ -tyo	◌꧀ꦠꦾꦺꦴꦃ -tyoh	◌꧀ꦠꦾꦺꦴꦁ -tyong	◌꧀ꦠꦾꦺꦴꦂ -tyor
ꦠꦾꦸ tyu	ꦠꦾꦸꦃ tyuh	ꦠꦾꦸꦁ tyung	ꦠꦾꦸꦂ tyur	◌꧀ꦠꦾꦸ -tyu	◌꧀ꦠꦾꦸꦃ -tyuh	◌꧀ꦠꦾꦸꦁ -tyung	◌꧀ꦠꦾꦸꦂ -tyur

== Unicode block ==
Javanese script was added to the Unicode Standard in October, 2009 with the release of version 5.2.

Javanese^{[1]}^{[2]} Official Unicode Consortium code chart (PDF)
	0	1	2	3	4	5	6	7	8	9	A	B	C	D	E	F
U+A98x	ꦀ	ꦁ	ꦂ	ꦃ	ꦄ	ꦅ	ꦆ	ꦇ	ꦈ	ꦉ	ꦊ	ꦋ	ꦌ	ꦍ	ꦎ	ꦏ
U+A99x	ꦐ	ꦑ	ꦒ	ꦓ	ꦔ	ꦕ	ꦖ	ꦗ	ꦘ	ꦙ	ꦚ	ꦛ	ꦜ	ꦝ	ꦞ	ꦟ
U+A9Ax	ꦠ	ꦡ	ꦢ	ꦣ	ꦤ	ꦥ	ꦦ	ꦧ	ꦨ	ꦩ	ꦪ	ꦫ	ꦬ	ꦭ	ꦮ	ꦯ
U+A9Bx	ꦰ	ꦱ	ꦲ	꦳	ꦴ	ꦵ	ꦶ	ꦷ	ꦸ	ꦹ	ꦺ	ꦻ	ꦼ	ꦽ	ꦾ	ꦿ
U+A9Cx	꧀	꧁	꧂	꧃	꧄	꧅	꧆	꧇	꧈	꧉	꧊	꧋	꧌	꧍		ꧏ
U+A9Dx	꧐	꧑	꧒	꧓	꧔	꧕	꧖	꧗	꧘	꧙					꧞	꧟
Notes 1.As of Unicode version 17.0 2.Grey areas indicate non-assigned code points
