= Mr. TNA =

Mr. TNA may refer to:

- Mr. TNA, a Total Nonstop Action Wrestling Year End Award
  - A.J. Styles, a professional wrestler who was voted "Mr. TNA" in 2003, 2004 and 2005
  - Samoa Joe, voted "Mr. TNA" in 2006 and 2007
  - Bobby Roode, voted "Mr. TNA" in 2014
