= T & A =

T&A may refer to:

- Bradford Telegraph & Argus, a newspaper in Bradford, England
- T & A (professional wrestling) (originally Test and Albert), a former pro-wrestling tag team
- Tonsillectomy and adenoidectomy, two operations that are often performed together
- T&A Records
- T & A San Marino, the San Marino Baseball Club
- "Little T&A", a Rolling Stones song
- Tanimura & Antle, produce distributor

== See also ==
- TNA (disambiguation)
- Tits 'n Ass, an album by Golden Earring
