= Ta (Indic) =

Letter "Ta" in Indic scripts

Example glyphs
- Bengali–Assamese: Ta
- Tibetan: Ta
- Tamil: Ta
- Thai: ด
- Malayalam: ത
- Sinhala: ත
- Ashoka Brahmi: Ta
- Devanagari: Ta

Cognates
- Hebrew: ת
- Greek: Τ, Ϛ
- Latin: T
- Cyrillic: Т, Ѿ

Properties
- Phonemic representation: /t/
- IAST transliteration: ta Ta
- ISCII code point: BA (186)

Ta is the sixteenth consonant of Indic abugidas. In modern Indic scripts, ta is derived from the early "Ashoka" Brahmi letter after having gone through the Gupta letter.

== Āryabhaṭṭa numeration ==
Aryabhata used Devanagari letters for numbers, very similar to the Greek numerals, even after the invention of Hindu-Arabic Numerals. The values of the different forms of त are:

- त [tə] = 16 (१६)
- ति [tɪ] = 1,600 (१ ६००)
- तु [tʊ] = 160,000 (१ ६० ०००)
- तृ [tri] = 16,000,000 (१ ६० ०० ०००)
- तॢ [tlə] = 1,600,000,000 (१ ६० ०० ०० ०००)
- ते [te] = 16×10^{10} (१६×१०^{१०})
- तै [tɛː] = 16×10^{12} (१६×१०^{१२})
- तो [toː] = 16×10^{14} (१६×१०^{१४}
- तौ [tɔː] = 16×10^{16} (१६×१०^{१६})

== Historic Ta ==
There are three different general early historic scripts - Brahmi and its variants, Kharoṣṭhī, and Tocharian, the so-called slanting Brahmi. Ta as found in standard Brahmi, was a simple geometric shape, with variations toward more flowing forms by the Gupta. The Tocharian Ta had an alternate Fremdzeichen form,. The third form of ta, in Kharoshthi was probably derived from Aramaic separately from the Brahmi letter.

=== Brahmi Ta ===
The Brahmi letter, Ta, is probably derived from the Aramaic Taw, and is thus related to the modern Latin T and Greek Tau. Several identifiable styles of writing the Brahmi Ta can be found, most associated with a specific set of inscriptions from an artifact or diverse records from an historic period. As the earliest and most geometric style of Brahmi, the letters found on the Edicts of Ashoka and other records from around that time are normally the reference form for Brahmi letters, with vowel marks not attested until later forms of Brahmi back-formed to match the geometric writing style.

Brahmi Ta historic forms
Ashoka (3rd-1st c. BCE)	Girnar (~150 BCE)	Kushana (~150-250 CE)	Gujarat (~250 CE)	Gupta (~350 CE)

=== Tocharian Ta ===
The Tocharian letter is derived from the Brahmi, and has an alternate Fremdzeichen form used in conjuncts and as an alternate representation of Tä.

Tocharian Ta with vowel marks
Ta	Tā	Ti	Tī	Tu	Tū	Tr	Tr̄	Te	Tai	To	Tau	Tä	Fremdzeichen

=== Kharoṣṭhī Ta ===
The Kharoṣṭhī letter is generally accepted as being derived from the Aramaic Taw, and is thus related to T and Tau, in addition to the Brahmi Ta.

== Devanagari Ta ==
Ta (त) is a consonant of the Devanagari abugida. It ultimately arose from the Brahmi letter, after having gone through the Gupta letter. Letters that derive from it are the Gujarati letter ત, and the Modi letter 𑘝.

=== Devanagari-using Languages ===
In all languages, त is pronounced as [tə] or [t] when appropriate. Like all Indic scripts, Devanagari uses vowel marks attached to the base consonant to override the inherent /ə/ vowel:

Devanagari त with vowel marks
Ta	Tā	Ti	Tī	Tu	Tū	Tr	Tr̄	Tl	Tl̄	Te	Tai	To	Tau	T
त	ता	ति	ती	तु	तू	तृ	तॄ	तॢ	तॣ	ते	तै	तो	तौ	त्

=== Conjuncts with त ===
Half form of Ta.

Devanagari exhibits conjunct ligatures, as is common in Indic scripts. In modern Devanagari texts, most conjuncts are formed by reducing the letter shape to fit tightly to the following letter, usually by dropping a character's vertical stem, sometimes referred to as a "half form". Some conjunct clusters are always represented by a true ligature, instead of a shape that can be broken into constituent independent letters. Vertically stacked conjuncts are ubiquitous in older texts, while only a few are still used routinely in modern Devanagari texts. The use of ligatures and vertical conjuncts may vary across languages using the Devanagari script, with Marathi in particular preferring the use of half forms where texts in other languages would show ligatures and vertical stacks.

==== Ligature conjuncts of त ====
True ligatures are quite rare in Indic scripts. The most common ligated conjuncts in Devanagari are in the form of a slight mutation to fit in context or as a consistent variant form appended to the adjacent characters. Those variants include Na and the Repha and Rakar forms of Ra. Nepali and Marathi texts use the "eyelash" Ra half form for an initial "R" instead of repha.

- Repha र্ (r) + त (ta) gives the ligature rta: ^{note}

- Eyelash र্ (r) + त (ta) gives the ligature rta:

- त্ (t) + rakar र (ra) gives the ligature tra:

- Repha र্ (r) + त্ (t) + rakar र (ra) gives the ligature rtra:

- त্ (t) + र্ (r) + य (ya) gives the ligature trya:

- क্ (k) + त (ta) gives the ligature kta:

- क্ (k) + त্ (t) + rakar र (ra) gives the ligature ktra:

- क্ (k) + त্ (t) + व (va) gives the ligature ktva:

- ङ্ (ŋ) + क্ (k) + त (ta) gives the ligature ŋkta:

- त্ (t) + त (ta) gives the ligature tta:

- Repha र্ (r) + त্ (t) + त (ta) gives the ligature rtta:

- त্ (t) + त্ (t) + rakar र (ra) gives the ligature ttra:

- Repha र্ (r) + त্ (t) + त্ (t) + rakar र (ra) gives the ligature rttra:

- त্ (t) + त্ (t) + न (na) gives the ligature ttna:

- त্ (t) + त্ (t) + व (va) gives the ligature ttva:

- प্ (p) + त (ta) gives the ligature pta:

- प্ (p) + त্ (t) + rakar र (ra) gives the ligature ptra:

- ष্ (ṣ) + त (ta) gives the ligature ṣta:

==== Stacked conjuncts of त ====
Vertically stacked ligatures are the most common conjunct forms found in Devanagari text. Although the constituent characters may need to be stretched and moved slightly in order to stack neatly, stacked conjuncts can be broken down into recognizable base letters, or a letter and an otherwise standard ligature.

- छ্ (cʰ) + त (ta) gives the ligature cʰta:

- ढ্ (ḍʱ) + त (ta) gives the ligature ḍʱta:

- ड্ (ḍ) + त (ta) gives the ligature ḍta:

- द্ (d) + त (ta) gives the ligature dta:

- ङ্ (ŋ) + त (ta) gives the ligature ŋta:

- त্ (t) + ब (ba) gives the ligature tba:

- त্ (t) + च (ca) gives the ligature tca:

- त্ (t) + ज (ja) gives the ligature tja:

- त্ (t) + ज্ (j) + ञ (ña) gives the ligature tjña:

- त্ (t) + ल (la) gives the ligature tla:

- त্ (t) + ञ (ña) gives the ligature tña:

- ठ্ (ṭʰ) + त (ta) gives the ligature ṭʰta:

- ट্ (ṭ) + त (ta) gives the ligature ṭta:

- त্ (t) + न (na) gives the ligature tna:

- त্ (t) + व (va) gives the ligature tva:

== Bengali Ta ==
The Bengali script ত is derived from the Siddhaṃ, and is marked by a similar horizontal head line, but less geometric shape, than its Devanagari counterpart, त. The inherent vowel of Bengali consonant letters is /ɔ/, so the bare letter ত will sometimes be transliterated as "to" instead of "ta". Adding okar, the "o" vowel mark, gives a reading of /t̪o/. Like all Indic consonants, ত can be modified by marks to indicate another (or no) vowel than its inherent "a".

Bengali ত with vowel marks
ta	tā	ti	tī	tu	tū	tr	tr̄	te	tai	to	tau	t
ত	তা	তি	তী	তু	তূ	তৃ	তৄ	তে	তৈ	তো	তৌ	ত্

=== ত in Bengali-using languages ===
ত is used as a basic consonant character in all of the major Bengali script orthographies, including Bengali and Assamese.

=== Conjuncts with ত ===
Bengali ত exhibits conjunct ligatures, as is common in Indic scripts, with a tendency towards stacked ligatures.

==== Khanda Ta ====
Khanda Ta

Some ostensible conjuncts with an initial ত are realized visually with a character called Khanda Ta "Broken Ta". This "broken" form of ত is used to represent the bare consonant without an inherent "A" vowel, and does not normally take vowel marks. It resembles the normal letter ত, but reversed, without a head line, and a reduced tail.

- ৎ (khanda ta) + ক (ka) gives the conjunct tka:

==== Other ত Conjuncts ====
Other conjuncts take the form of a ligature when ত is the initial head consonant, or usually as a stacked conjunct when ত is non-head. As is normal, as a later element in a stacked conjunct, ত loses its head line when conjoining, and has a reduced tail when followed by Ra-phala.

- ক্ (k) + ত (ta) gives the ligature kta:

- ক্ (k) + ত্ (t) + র (ra) gives the ligature ktra, with the ra phala suffix:

- ন্ (n) + ত (ta) gives the ligature nta:

- ন্ (n) + ত্ (t) + র (ra) gives the ligature ntra, with the ra phala suffix:

- ন্ (n) + ত্ (t) + র্ (r) + য (ya) gives the ligature ntrya, with the ra phala and ya phala suffixes

- ন্ (n) + ত্ (t) + ব (va) gives the ligature ntva, with the va phala suffix:

- ন্ (n) + ত্ (t) + য (ya) gives the ligature ntya, with the ya phala suffix:

- প্ (p) + ত (ta) gives the ligature pta:

- র্ (r) + ত (ta) gives the ligature rta, with the repha prefix:

- র্ (r) + ত্ (t) + র (ra) gives the ligature rtra, with the repha prefix and ra phala suffix:

- র্ (r) + ত্ (t) + য (ya) gives the ligature rtya, with the repha prefix and ya phala suffix:

- স্ (s) + ত (ta) gives the ligature sta:

- স্ (s) + ত্ (t) + র (ra) gives the ligature stra, with the ra phala suffix:

- স্ (s) + ত্ (t) + ব (va) gives the ligature stva, with the va phala suffix:

- স্ (s) + ত্ (t) + য (ya) gives the ligature stya, with the ya phala suffix:

- ত্ (t) + ম (ma) gives the ligature tma:

- ত্ (t) + ম্ (m) + য (ya) gives the ligature tmya, with the ya phala suffix:

- ত্ (t) + ন (na) gives the ligature tna:

- ত্ (t) + র (ra) gives the ligature tra, with the ra phala suffix:

- ত্ (t) + র্ (r) + য (ya) gives the ligature trya, with the ra phala and ya phala suffixes

- ত্ (t) + স (sa) gives the ligature tsa:

- ত্ (t) + ত (ta) gives the ligature tta:

- ত্ (t) + থ (tʰa) gives the ligature ttʰa:

- ত্ (t) + ত্ (t) + ব (va) gives the ligature ttva, with the va phala suffix:

- ত্ (t) + ত্ (t) + য (ya) gives the ligature ttya, with the ya phala suffix:

- ত্ (t) + ব (va) gives the ligature tva, with the va phala suffix:

- ত্ (t) + য (ya) gives the ligature tya, with the ya phala suffix:

== Gujarati Ta ==
Gujarati Ta.

Ta (ત) is the sixteenth consonant of the Gujarati abugida. It is derived from the Devanagari Ta with the top bar (shiro rekha) removed, and ultimately the Brahmi letter.

=== Gujarati-using Languages ===
The Gujarati script is used to write the Gujarati and Kutchi languages. In both languages, ત is pronounced as [tə] or [t] when appropriate. Like all Indic scripts, Gujarati uses vowel marks attached to the base consonant to override the inherent /ə/ vowel:

Ta	Tā	Ti	Tī	Tu	Tū	Tr	Tl	Tr̄	Tl̄	Tĕ	Te	Tai	Tŏ	To	Tau	T
Gujarati Ta syllables, with vowel marks in red.

=== Conjuncts with ત ===
Half form of Ta.

Gujarati ત exhibits conjunct ligatures, much like its parent Devanagari Script. Most Gujarati conjuncts can only be formed by reducing the letter shape to fit tightly to the following letter, usually by dropping a character's vertical stem, sometimes referred to as a "half form". A few conjunct clusters can be represented by a true ligature, instead of a shape that can be broken into constituent independent letters, and vertically stacked conjuncts can also be found in Gujarati, although much less commonly than in Devanagari. True ligatures are quite rare in Indic scripts. The most common ligated conjuncts in Gujarati are in the form of a slight mutation to fit in context or as a consistent variant form appended to the adjacent characters. Those variants include Na and the Repha and Rakar forms of Ra.

- ર્ (r) + ત (ta) gives the ligature RTa:

- ત્ (t) + ર (ra) gives the ligature TRa:

- ત્ (t) + ત (ta) gives the ligature TTa:

- ત્ (t) + ન (na) gives the ligature TNa:

- પ્ (p) + ત (ta) gives the ligature PTa:

- ષ્ (ʂ) + ત (ta) gives the ligature ṢTa:

== Telugu Ta ==
Telugu independent and subjoined Ta.

Ta (త) is a consonant of the Telugu abugida. It ultimately arose from the Brahmi letter. It is closely related to the Kannada letter ತ. Most Telugu consonants contain a v-shaped headstroke that is related to the horizontal headline found in other Indic scripts, although headstrokes do not connect adjacent letters in Telugu. The headstroke is normally lost when adding vowel matras. Telugu conjuncts are created by reducing trailing letters to a subjoined form that appears below the initial consonant of the conjunct. Many subjoined forms are created by dropping their headline, with many extending the end of the stroke of the main letter body to form an extended tail reaching up to the right of the preceding consonant. This subjoining of trailing letters to create conjuncts is in contrast to the leading half forms of Devanagari and Bengali letters. Ligature conjuncts are not a feature in Telugu, with the only non-standard construction being an alternate subjoined form of Ṣa (borrowed from Kannada) in the KṢa conjunct.

== Malayalam Ta ==
Malayalam letter Ta

Ta (ത) is a consonant of the Malayalam abugida. It ultimately arose from the Brahmi letter, via the Grantha letter Ta. Like in other Indic scripts, Malayalam consonants have the inherent vowel "a", and take one of several modifying vowel signs to represent syllables with another vowel or no vowel at all.

Malayalam Ta matras: Ta, Tā, Ti, Tī, Tu, Tū, Tr̥, Tr̥̄, Tl̥, Tl̥̄, Te, Tē, Tai, To, Tō, Tau, and T.

=== Conjuncts of ത ===
As is common in Indic scripts, Malayalam joins letters together to form conjunct consonant clusters. There are several ways in which conjuncts are formed in Malayalam texts: using a post-base form of a trailing consonant placed under the initial consonant of a conjunct, a combined ligature of two or more consonants joined together, a conjoining form that appears as a combining mark on the rest of the conjunct, the use of an explicit candrakkala mark to suppress the inherent "a" vowel, or a special consonant form called a "chillu" letter, representing a bare consonant without the inherent "a" vowel. Texts written with the modern reformed Malayalam orthography, put̪iya lipi, may favor more regular conjunct forms than older texts in paḻaya lipi, due to changes undertaken in the 1970s by the Government of Kerala.

- ക് (k) + ത (ta) gives the ligature kta:

- ത് (t) + ത (ta) gives the ligature tta:

- ന് (n) + ത (ta) gives the ligature nta:

- പ് (p) + ത (ta) gives the ligature pta:

- യ് (y) + ത (ta) gives the ligature yta:

- സ് (s) + ത (ta) gives the ligature sta:

- ത് (t) + ഥ (tʰa) gives the ligature ttʰa:

- ത് (t) + ന (na) gives the ligature tna:

- ത് (t) + ഭ (bʰa) gives the ligature tbʰa:

- ത് (t) + മ (ma) gives the ligature tma:

- ത് (t) + സ (sa) gives the ligature tsa:

== Odia Ta ==
Odia independent and subjoined letter Ta.

Ta (ତ) is a consonant of the Odia abugida. It ultimately arose from the Brahmi letter, via the Siddhaṃ letter Ta. Like in other Indic scripts, Odia consonants have the inherent vowel "a", and take one of several modifying vowel signs to represent syllables with another vowel or no vowel at all.

Odia Ta with vowel matras
Ta	Tā	Ti	Tī	Tu	Tū	Tr̥	Tr̥̄	Tl̥	Tl̥̄	Te	Tai	To	Tau	T
ତ	ତା	ତି	ତୀ	ତୁ	ତୂ	ତୃ	ତୄ	ତୢ	ତୣ	ତେ	ତୈ	ତୋ	ତୌ	ତ୍

=== Conjuncts of ତ ===
As is common in Indic scripts, Odia joins letters together to form conjunct consonant clusters. The most common conjunct formation is achieved by using a small subjoined form of trailing consonants. Most consonants' subjoined forms are identical to the full form, just reduced in size, although a few drop the curved headline or have a subjoined form not directly related to the full form of the consonant. The second type of conjunct formation is through pure ligatures, where the constituent consonants are written together in a single graphic form. This ligature may be recognizable as being a combination of two characters or it can have a conjunct ligature unrelated to its constituent characters.

- ତ୍ (t) + କ (ka) gives the ligature tka:

- ତ୍ (t) + ତ (ta) gives the ligature tta:

- ତ୍ (t) + ସ (sa) gives the ligature tsa:

== Kaithi Ta ==
Kaithi consonant and half-form Ta.

Ta (𑂞) is a consonant of the Kaithi abugida. It ultimately arose from the Brahmi letter, via the Siddhaṃ letter Ta. Like in other Indic scripts, Kaithi consonants have the inherent vowel "a", and take one of several modifying vowel signs to represent syllables with another vowel or no vowel at all.

Kaithi Ta with vowel matras
Ta	Tā	Ti	Tī	Tu	Tū	Te	Tai	To	Tau	T
𑂞	𑂞𑂰	𑂞𑂱	𑂞𑂲	𑂞𑂳	𑂞𑂴	𑂞𑂵	𑂞𑂶	𑂞𑂷	𑂞𑂸	𑂞𑂹

=== Conjuncts of 𑂞 ===
As is common in Indic scripts, Kaithi joins letters together to form conjunct consonant clusters. The most common conjunct formation is achieved by using a half form of preceding consonants, although several consonants use an explicit virama. Most half forms are derived from the full form by removing the vertical stem. As is common in most Indic scripts, conjuncts of ra are indicated with a repha or rakar mark attached to the rest of the consonant cluster. In addition, there are a few vertical conjuncts that can be found in Kaithi writing, but true ligatures are not used in the modern Kaithi script.

- 𑂞୍ (t) + 𑂩 (ra) gives the ligature tra:

- 𑂩୍ (r) + 𑂞 (ta) gives the ligature rta:

== Tirhuta Ta ==
Tirhuta consonant Ta

Ta (𑒞) is a consonant of the Tirhuta abugida. It ultimately arose from the Brahmi letter, via the Siddhaṃ letter Ta. Like in other Indic scripts, Tirhuta consonants have the inherent vowel "a", and take one of several modifying vowel signs to represent sylables with another vowel or no vowel at all.

Tirhuta Ta with vowel matras
Ta	Tā	Ti	Tī	Tu	Tū	ṛ	ṝ	ḷ	ḹ	Tē	Te	Tai	Tō	To	Tau	T
𑒞	𑒞𑒰	𑒞𑒱	𑒞𑒲	𑒞𑒳	𑒞𑒴	𑒞𑒵	𑒞𑒶	𑒞𑒷	𑒞𑒸	𑒞𑒹	𑒞𑒺	𑒞𑒻	𑒞𑒼	𑒞𑒽	𑒞𑒾	𑒞𑓂

=== Conjuncts of 𑒞 ===
Tirhuta letter Ta combining form.

As is common in Indic scripts, Tirhuta joins letters together to form conjunct consonant clusters. As is common in most Indic scripts, conjuncts of ra are indicated with a repha or rakar mark attached to the rest of the consonant cluster. Unlike most Tirhuta letters, Ta 𑒞 does not take an explicit virama when forming conjuncts, but rather has an explicit combining form.

- 𑒢୍ (n) + 𑒞 (ta) gives the ligature nta:

- 𑒩୍ (r) + 𑒞 (ta) gives the ligature rta:

- 𑒮୍ (s) + 𑒞 (ta) gives the ligature sta:

- 𑒞୍ (t) + 𑒥 (ba) gives the ligature tba:

- 𑒞୍ (t) + 𑒦 (bʰa) gives the ligature tbʰa:

- 𑒞୍ (t) + 𑒔 (ca) gives the ligature tca:

- 𑒞୍ (t) + 𑒕 (cʰa) gives the ligature tcʰa:

- 𑒞୍ (t) + 𑒠 (da) gives the ligature tda:

- 𑒞୍ (t) + 𑒛 (ḍa) gives the ligature tḍa:

- 𑒞୍ (t) + 𑒡 (dʱa) gives the ligature tdʱa:

- 𑒞୍ (t) + 𑒑 (ga) gives the ligature tga:

- 𑒞୍ (t) + 𑒒 (ɡʱa) gives the ligature tɡʱa:

- 𑒞୍ (t) + 𑒯 (ha) gives the ligature tha:

- 𑒞୍ (t) + 𑒖 (ja) gives the ligature tja:

- 𑒞୍ (t) + 𑒗 (jʰa) gives the ligature tjʰa:

- 𑒞୍ (t) + 𑒖୍ (j) + 𑒘 (ña) gives the ligature tjña:

- 𑒞୍ (t) + 𑒏 (ka) gives the ligature tka:

- 𑒞୍ (t) + 𑒐 (kʰa) gives the ligature tkʰa:

- 𑒞୍ (t) + 𑒏 (ka) gives the ligature tka:

- 𑒞୍ (t) + 𑒪 (la) gives the ligature tla:

- 𑒞୍ (t) + 𑒧 (ma) gives the ligature tma:

- 𑒞୍ (t) + 𑒢 (na) gives the ligature tna:

- 𑒞୍ (t) + 𑒓 (ŋa) gives the ligature tŋa:

- 𑒞୍ (t) + 𑒝 (ṇa) gives the ligature tṇa:

- 𑒞୍ (t) + 𑒘 (ña) gives the ligature tña:

- 𑒞୍ (t) + 𑒣 (pa) gives the ligature tpa:

- 𑒞୍ (t) + 𑒤 (pʰa) gives the ligature tpʰa:

- 𑒞 (t) + 𑒇 (ṛ) gives the ligature tṛ:

- 𑒞୍ (t) + 𑒩 (ra) gives the ligature tra:

- 𑒞୍ (t) + 𑒮 (sa) gives the ligature tsa:

- 𑒞୍ (t) + 𑒬 (ʃa) gives the ligature tʃa:

- 𑒞୍ (t) + 𑒭 (ṣa) gives the ligature tṣa:

- 𑒞୍ (t) + 𑒟 (tʰa) gives the ligature ttʰa:

- 𑒞୍ (t) + 𑒙 (ṭa) gives the ligature tṭa:

- 𑒞୍ (t) + 𑒚 (ṭʰa) gives the ligature tṭʰa:

- 𑒞 (t) + 𑒅 (u) gives the ligature tu:

- 𑒞 (t) + 𑒆 (ū) gives the ligature tū:

- 𑒞୍ (t) + 𑒫 (va) gives the ligature tva:

- 𑒞୍ (t) + 𑒨 (ya) gives the ligature tya:

== Comparison of Ta ==
The various Indic scripts are generally related to each other through adaptation and borrowing, and as such the glyphs for cognate letters, including Ta, are related as well.

Comparison of Ta in different scripts

Aramaic
Kharoṣṭhī 𐨟	Ashoka Brahmi	Kushana Brahmi (Note: The middle "Kushana" form of Brahmi is a later style that emerged as Brahmi scripts were beginning to proliferate. Gupta Brahmi was definitely a stylistic descendant from Kushana, but other Brahmi-derived scripts may have descended from earlier forms.)	Tocharian (Note: Tocharian is probably derived from the middle period "Kushana" form of Brahmi, although artifacts from that time are not plentiful enough to establish a definite succession.) /
Gupta Brahmi	Pallava
Kadamba -
Bhaiksuki 𑰝	Siddhaṃ	Grantha 𑌤	Cham ꨓ
Sinhala ත	Pyu / Old Mon (Note: Pyu and Old Mon are probably the precursors of the Burmese script, and may be derived from either the Pallava or Kadamba script) -
Tibetan	Newa 𑐟	Ahom 𑜄	Malayalam ത
Telugu త	Burmese တ
Lepcha ᰊ	Ranjana	Saurashtra ꢡ	Dives Akuru 𑤛
Kannada ತ	Kayah Li -
Limbu	Soyombo (Note: May also be derived from Devangari (see bottom left of table)) 𑩫	Khmer ត	Tamil
Chakma 𑄖	Tai Tham ᨲ
Meitei Mayek ꯇ	Gaudi -	Thai ต / ด	Lao ຕ / ດ
Tai Le ᥖ
Marchen 𑱺	Tirhuta 𑒞	New Tai Lue ᦎ	Tai Viet ꪔ	Aksara Kawi
'Phags-pa ꡈ	Odia ତ	Sharada 𑆘	Rejang ꤳ	Batak ᯖ / ᯗ	Buginese ᨈ
Zanabazar Square 𑨙	Bengali–Assamese	Takri 𑚙	Javanese ꦠ	Balinese ᬢ	Makasar 𑻦
Hangul (Note: The Origin of Hangul from 'Phags-pa is one of limited influence, inspiring at most a few basic letter shapes. Hangul does not function as an Indic abugida.) -	Northern Nagari -	Dogri 𑠙	Laṇḍā -	Sundanese ᮒ	Baybayin ᜆ
Modi 𑘝	Gujarati ત	Khojki 𑈙	Khudabadi 𑋍	Mahajani 𑅣	Tagbanwa ᝦ
Devanagari	Nandinagari 𑦽	Kaithi	Gurmukhi ਤ	Multani 𑊖	Buhid ᝆ
Canadian Syllabics (Note: Although the basic letter forms of the Canadian Aboriginal Syllabics were derived from handwritten Devanagari letters, this abugida indicates vowel sounds by rotations of the letter form, rather than the use of vowel diacritics as is standard in Indic abugidas.) -	Soyombo (Note: May also be derived from Ranjana (see above)) 𑩫	Sylheti Nagari ꠔ	Gunjala Gondi 𑵳	Masaram Gondi (Note: Masaram Gondi acts as an Indic abugida, but its letterforms were not derived from any single precursor script.) 𑴛	Hanuno'o ᜦ

== Character encodings of Ta ==
Most Indic scripts are encoded in the Unicode Standard, and as such the letter Ta in those scripts can be represented in plain text with unique codepoint. Ta from several modern-use scripts can also be found in legacy encodings, such as ISCII.

Character information
Preview							త		ତ		ತ		ത		ત		ਤ	
Unicode name	DEVANAGARI LETTER TA		BENGALI LETTER TA		TAMIL LETTER TA		TELUGU LETTER TA		ORIYA LETTER TA		KANNADA LETTER TA		MALAYALAM LETTER TA		GUJARATI LETTER TA		GURMUKHI LETTER TA	
Encodings	decimal	hex	dec	hex	dec	hex	dec	hex	dec	hex	dec	hex	dec	hex	dec	hex	dec	hex
Unicode	2340	U+0924	2468	U+09A4	2980	U+0BA4	3108	U+0C24	2852	U+0B24	3236	U+0CA4	3364	U+0D24	2724	U+0AA4	2596	U+0A24
UTF-8	224 164 164	E0 A4 A4	224 166 164	E0 A6 A4	224 174 164	E0 AE A4	224 176 164	E0 B0 A4	224 172 164	E0 AC A4	224 178 164	E0 B2 A4	224 180 164	E0 B4 A4	224 170 164	E0 AA A4	224 168 164	E0 A8 A4
Numeric character reference	&#2340;	&#x924;	&#2468;	&#x9A4;	&#2980;	&#xBA4;	&#3108;	&#xC24;	&#2852;	&#xB24;	&#3236;	&#xCA4;	&#3364;	&#xD24;	&#2724;	&#xAA4;	&#2596;	&#xA24;
ISCII	186	BA	186	BA	186	BA	186	BA	186	BA	186	BA	186	BA	186	BA	186	BA

Character information
Preview	Ashoka Kushana Gupta		𐨟				𑌤	
Unicode name	BRAHMI LETTER JA		KHAROSHTHI LETTER TA		SIDDHAM LETTER TA		GRANTHA LETTER TA	
Encodings	decimal	hex	dec	hex	dec	hex	dec	hex
Unicode	69658	U+1101A	68127	U+10A1F	71069	U+1159D	70436	U+11324
UTF-8	240 145 128 154	F0 91 80 9A	240 144 168 159	F0 90 A8 9F	240 145 150 157	F0 91 96 9D	240 145 140 164	F0 91 8C A4
UTF-16	55300 56346	D804 DC1A	55298 56863	D802 DE1F	55301 56733	D805 DD9D	55300 57124	D804 DF24
Numeric character reference	&#69658;	&#x1101A;	&#68127;	&#x10A1F;	&#71069;	&#x1159D;	&#70436;	&#x11324;

Character information
Preview			ྟ		ꡈ		𑨙		𑐟		𑰝		𑆘	
Unicode name	TIBETAN LETTER TA		TIBETAN SUBJOINED LETTER TA		PHAGS-PA LETTER TA		ZANABAZAR SQUARE LETTER TA		NEWA LETTER TA		BHAIKSUKI LETTER TA		SHARADA LETTER JA	
Encodings	decimal	hex	dec	hex	dec	hex	dec	hex	dec	hex	dec	hex	dec	hex
Unicode	3919	U+0F4F	3999	U+0F9F	43080	U+A848	72217	U+11A19	70687	U+1141F	72733	U+11C1D	70040	U+11198
UTF-8	224 189 143	E0 BD 8F	224 190 159	E0 BE 9F	234 161 136	EA A1 88	240 145 168 153	F0 91 A8 99	240 145 144 159	F0 91 90 9F	240 145 176 157	F0 91 B0 9D	240 145 134 152	F0 91 86 98
UTF-16	3919	0F4F	3999	0F9F	43080	A848	55302 56857	D806 DE19	55301 56351	D805 DC1F	55303 56349	D807 DC1D	55300 56728	D804 DD98
Numeric character reference	&#3919;	&#xF4F;	&#3999;	&#xF9F;	&#43080;	&#xA848;	&#72217;	&#x11A19;	&#70687;	&#x1141F;	&#72733;	&#x11C1D;	&#70040;	&#x11198;

Character information
Preview	တ		ᨲ		ᦑ	
Unicode name	MYANMAR LETTER TA		TAI THAM LETTER HIGH TA		NEW TAI LUE LETTER LOW TA	
Encodings	decimal	hex	dec	hex	dec	hex
Unicode	4112	U+1010	6706	U+1A32	6545	U+1991
UTF-8	225 128 144	E1 80 90	225 168 178	E1 A8 B2	225 166 145	E1 A6 91
Numeric character reference	&#4112;	&#x1010;	&#6706;	&#x1A32;	&#6545;	&#x1991;

Character information
Preview	ត		ຕ		ດ		ต		ด		ꪔ	
Unicode name	KHMER LETTER TA		LAO LETTER TO		LAO LETTER DO		THAI CHARACTER TO TAO		THAI CHARACTER DO DEK		TAI VIET LETTER LOW TO	
Encodings	decimal	hex	dec	hex	dec	hex	dec	hex	dec	hex	dec	hex
Unicode	6031	U+178F	3733	U+0E95	3732	U+0E94	3605	U+0E15	3604	U+0E14	43668	U+AA94
UTF-8	225 158 143	E1 9E 8F	224 186 149	E0 BA 95	224 186 148	E0 BA 94	224 184 149	E0 B8 95	224 184 148	E0 B8 94	234 170 148	EA AA 94
Numeric character reference	&#6031;	&#x178F;	&#3733;	&#xE95;	&#3732;	&#xE94;	&#3605;	&#xE15;	&#3604;	&#xE14;	&#43668;	&#xAA94;

Character information
Preview	ත		𑄖		ᥖ		𑜄		𑤛		ꢡ		ꨓ	
Unicode name	SINHALA LETTER ALPAPRAANA TAYANNA		CHAKMA LETTER TAA		TAI LE LETTER TA		AHOM LETTER TA		DIVES AKURU LETTER TA		SAURASHTRA LETTER TA		CHAM LETTER TA	
Encodings	decimal	hex	dec	hex	dec	hex	dec	hex	dec	hex	dec	hex	dec	hex
Unicode	3501	U+0DAD	69910	U+11116	6486	U+1956	71428	U+11704	71963	U+1191B	43169	U+A8A1	43539	U+AA13
UTF-8	224 182 173	E0 B6 AD	240 145 132 150	F0 91 84 96	225 165 150	E1 A5 96	240 145 156 132	F0 91 9C 84	240 145 164 155	F0 91 A4 9B	234 162 161	EA A2 A1	234 168 147	EA A8 93
UTF-16	3501	0DAD	55300 56598	D804 DD16	6486	1956	55301 57092	D805 DF04	55302 56603	D806 DD1B	43169	A8A1	43539	AA13
Numeric character reference	&#3501;	&#xDAD;	&#69910;	&#x11116;	&#6486;	&#x1956;	&#71428;	&#x11704;	&#71963;	&#x1191B;	&#43169;	&#xA8A1;	&#43539;	&#xAA13;

Character information
Preview	𑘝		𑦽		𑩫		ꠔ		𑵳			
Unicode name	MODI LETTER TA		NANDINAGARI LETTER TA		SOYOMBO LETTER TA		SYLOTI NAGRI LETTER TO		GUNJALA GONDI LETTER TA		KAITHI LETTER TA	
Encodings	decimal	hex	dec	hex	dec	hex	dec	hex	dec	hex	dec	hex
Unicode	71197	U+1161D	72125	U+119BD	72299	U+11A6B	43028	U+A814	73075	U+11D73	69790	U+1109E
UTF-8	240 145 152 157	F0 91 98 9D	240 145 166 189	F0 91 A6 BD	240 145 169 171	F0 91 A9 AB	234 160 148	EA A0 94	240 145 181 179	F0 91 B5 B3	240 145 130 158	F0 91 82 9E
UTF-16	55301 56861	D805 DE1D	55302 56765	D806 DDBD	55302 56939	D806 DE6B	43028	A814	55303 56691	D807 DD73	55300 56478	D804 DC9E
Numeric character reference	&#71197;	&#x1161D;	&#72125;	&#x119BD;	&#72299;	&#x11A6B;	&#43028;	&#xA814;	&#73075;	&#x11D73;	&#69790;	&#x1109E;

Character information
Preview	𑒞		ᰊ				ꯇ		𑱺	
Unicode name	TIRHUTA LETTER TA		LEPCHA LETTER TA		LIMBU LETTER TA		MEETEI MAYEK LETTER TIL		MARCHEN LETTER TA	
Encodings	decimal	hex	dec	hex	dec	hex	dec	hex	dec	hex
Unicode	70814	U+1149E	7178	U+1C0A	6411	U+190B	43975	U+ABC7	72826	U+11C7A
UTF-8	240 145 146 158	F0 91 92 9E	225 176 138	E1 B0 8A	225 164 139	E1 A4 8B	234 175 135	EA AF 87	240 145 177 186	F0 91 B1 BA
UTF-16	55301 56478	D805 DC9E	7178	1C0A	6411	190B	43975	ABC7	55303 56442	D807 DC7A
Numeric character reference	&#70814;	&#x1149E;	&#7178;	&#x1C0A;	&#6411;	&#x190B;	&#43975;	&#xABC7;	&#72826;	&#x11C7A;

Character information
Preview	𑚙		𑠙		𑈙		𑋍		𑅣		𑊖	
Unicode name	TAKRI LETTER TA		DOGRA LETTER TA		KHOJKI LETTER TA		KHUDAWADI LETTER TA		MAHAJANI LETTER TA		MULTANI LETTER TA	
Encodings	decimal	hex	dec	hex	dec	hex	dec	hex	dec	hex	dec	hex
Unicode	71321	U+11699	71705	U+11819	70169	U+11219	70349	U+112CD	69987	U+11163	70294	U+11296
UTF-8	240 145 154 153	F0 91 9A 99	240 145 160 153	F0 91 A0 99	240 145 136 153	F0 91 88 99	240 145 139 141	F0 91 8B 8D	240 145 133 163	F0 91 85 A3	240 145 138 150	F0 91 8A 96
UTF-16	55301 56985	D805 DE99	55302 56345	D806 DC19	55300 56857	D804 DE19	55300 57037	D804 DECD	55300 56675	D804 DD63	55300 56982	D804 DE96
Numeric character reference	&#71321;	&#x11699;	&#71705;	&#x11819;	&#70169;	&#x11219;	&#70349;	&#x112CD;	&#69987;	&#x11163;	&#70294;	&#x11296;

Character information
Preview	ᬢ		ᨈ		ꦠ		𑻦		ꤳ		ᮒ	
Unicode name	BALINESE LETTER TA		BUGINESE LETTER TA		JAVANESE LETTER TA		MAKASAR LETTER TA		REJANG LETTER TA		SUNDANESE LETTER TA	
Encodings	decimal	hex	dec	hex	dec	hex	dec	hex	dec	hex	dec	hex
Unicode	6946	U+1B22	6664	U+1A08	43424	U+A9A0	73446	U+11EE6	43315	U+A933	7058	U+1B92
UTF-8	225 172 162	E1 AC A2	225 168 136	E1 A8 88	234 166 160	EA A6 A0	240 145 187 166	F0 91 BB A6	234 164 179	EA A4 B3	225 174 146	E1 AE 92
UTF-16	6946	1B22	6664	1A08	43424	A9A0	55303 57062	D807 DEE6	43315	A933	7058	1B92
Numeric character reference	&#6946;	&#x1B22;	&#6664;	&#x1A08;	&#43424;	&#xA9A0;	&#73446;	&#x11EE6;	&#43315;	&#xA933;	&#7058;	&#x1B92;

Character information
Preview	ᜆ		ᝦ		ᝆ		ᜦ		𑴛	
Unicode name	TAGALOG LETTER TA		TAGBANWA LETTER TA		BUHID LETTER TA		HANUNOO LETTER TA		MASARAM GONDI LETTER TA	
Encodings	decimal	hex	dec	hex	dec	hex	dec	hex	dec	hex
Unicode	5894	U+1706	5990	U+1766	5958	U+1746	5926	U+1726	72987	U+11D1B
UTF-8	225 156 134	E1 9C 86	225 157 166	E1 9D A6	225 157 134	E1 9D 86	225 156 166	E1 9C A6	240 145 180 155	F0 91 B4 9B
UTF-16	5894	1706	5990	1766	5958	1746	5926	1726	55303 56603	D807 DD1B
Numeric character reference	&#5894;	&#x1706;	&#5990;	&#x1766;	&#5958;	&#x1746;	&#5926;	&#x1726;	&#72987;	&#x11D1B;
