= Testarossa (disambiguation) =

The Ferrari Testarossa is an Italian sports car from the 1980s and '90s.

Testarossa or Testa rossa (Italian for redhead) may refer to:

- Ferrari 250 TR (Testa Rossa), an Italian sports car from the 1950s and '60s
- Ferrari Monza 500 TR (Testa Rossa), an Italian race car from 1954
- Ferrari 849 Testarossa (Testa Rossa), an Italian plug-in hybrid supercar.
- Fate Testarossa, a fictional character in the anime series Magical Girl Lyrical Nanoha
- Teletha Tessa Testarossa, a fictional character from the light novel, manga, and anime series Full Metal Panic!
- Testarossa (album), a 2016 album by Yoni & Geti
- "Testarossa", a 1992 song by Sir Mix-a-Lot from the album Mack Daddy

== See also ==
- The dictionary definition of redhead#Translations at Wiktionary
- "I, Testarossa", a 2016 song by Yoni & Geti off the album Testarossa (album)
- Ferrari TR (set index) aka Testa Rossa, several cars
- Redhead (disambiguation)
- Testa (disambiguation)
- Rossa (disambiguation)
