= Iroungou Cave =

Cave at Mouila, Gabon

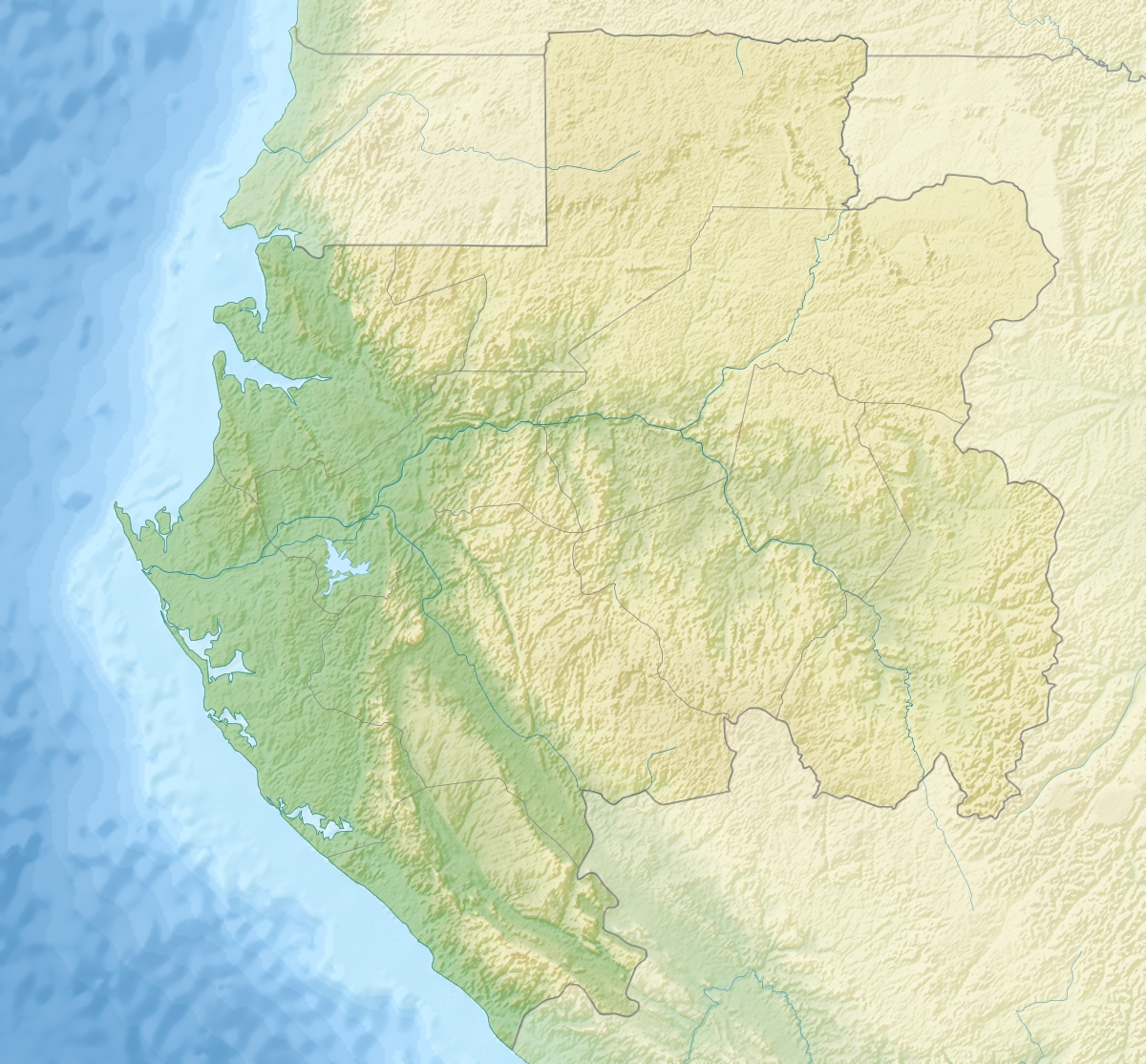
- Iroungou cave in Gabon
- 1°52′0″S 11°3′18″E
- Location: Mouila, Ngounié Province
- Region: Gabon

Iroungou Cave is a burial cave located near the city of Mouila in the Ngounié Province of Gabon. It is an archaeological site dating from pre-colonial Africa. It is a collective burial site with the remains of at least 28 people, and hundreds of iron, copper and shell artefacts. The site has no equivalent in West central Africa.

== Geology ==
The Iroungou Cave is formed in neoproterozoic limestone, from the schisto-calcaire series.

== History of investigations ==
Iroungou Cave has been discovered by Olivier Testa and Richard Oslisly in 2018. The main chamber of the cave is accessible through a natural shaft 15 meters deep. When exploring the cave, the speleologist reported hundreds of human bones scattered on the ground from at least 28 individuals, and numerous iron and copper artefacts. Since then, a series of archeological missions and excavations conducted by the CNRS in conjunction with the National Agency for National Parks have inventoried 512 artefacts. Only superficial artifacts have been recovered.

== Recovered artifacts ==
During 4 missions in 2019-2020, 486 iron and 26 copper objects, 127 Atlantic marine shells (15 of them being pierced), and 39 pierced carnivore teeth have been recovered. Metallic artifacts consist of currency hoes, bracelets, rings, knives, spears, iron bells (gongs), and a new type of object, eight 70cm-long, spatula-shaped forged iron rods, never found elsewhere in Africa.

== Age of the burials ==
Preliminary datings have been carried on twenty bone samples from Iroungou skeletons using carbon-14. The inhumations spans between the 14th and 15th century AD. The corpses where thrown or lowered from the top of the shaft. In all of the skulls in the cave, none have their upper incisors. The teeth have been removed during the life of the individual, as an ethnic marker or a social role marker.

== Gallery ==
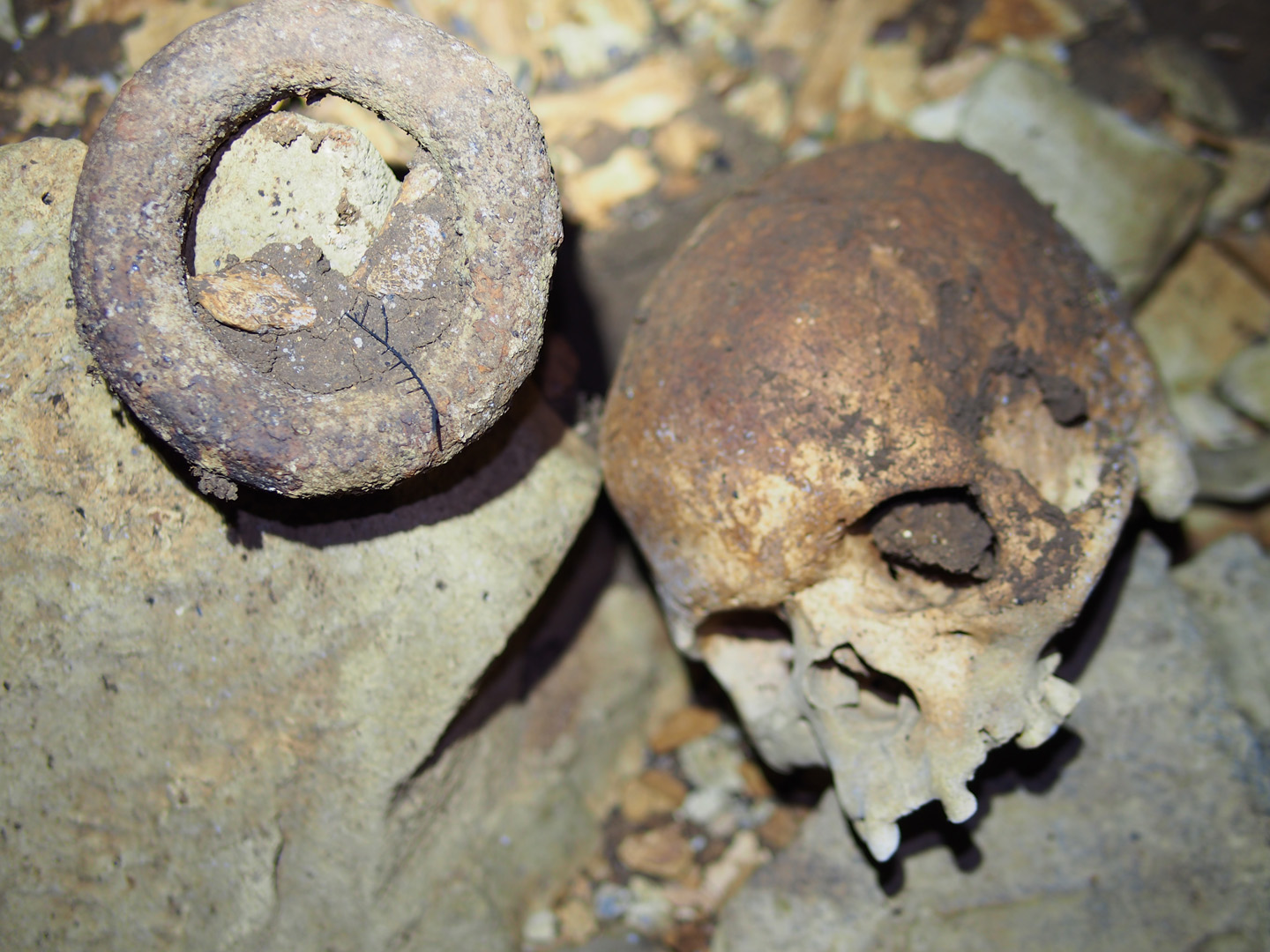
Human skull and an iron currency bracelet found at the bottom of Iroungou Cave in Gabon

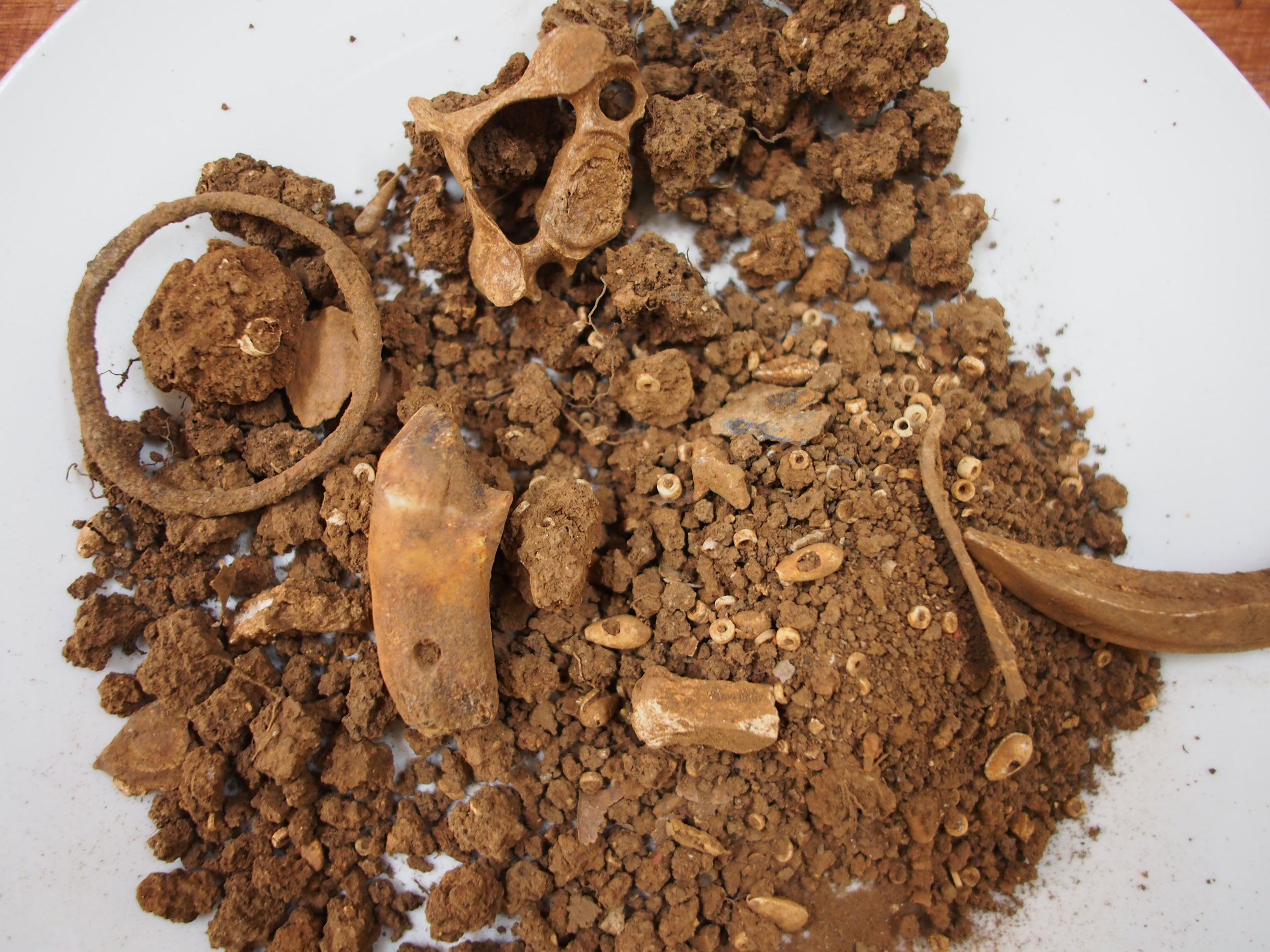
Sample of artefacts recovered from Iroungou Cave : pierced tooth, pierced shells, small bones, copper ring, beads...

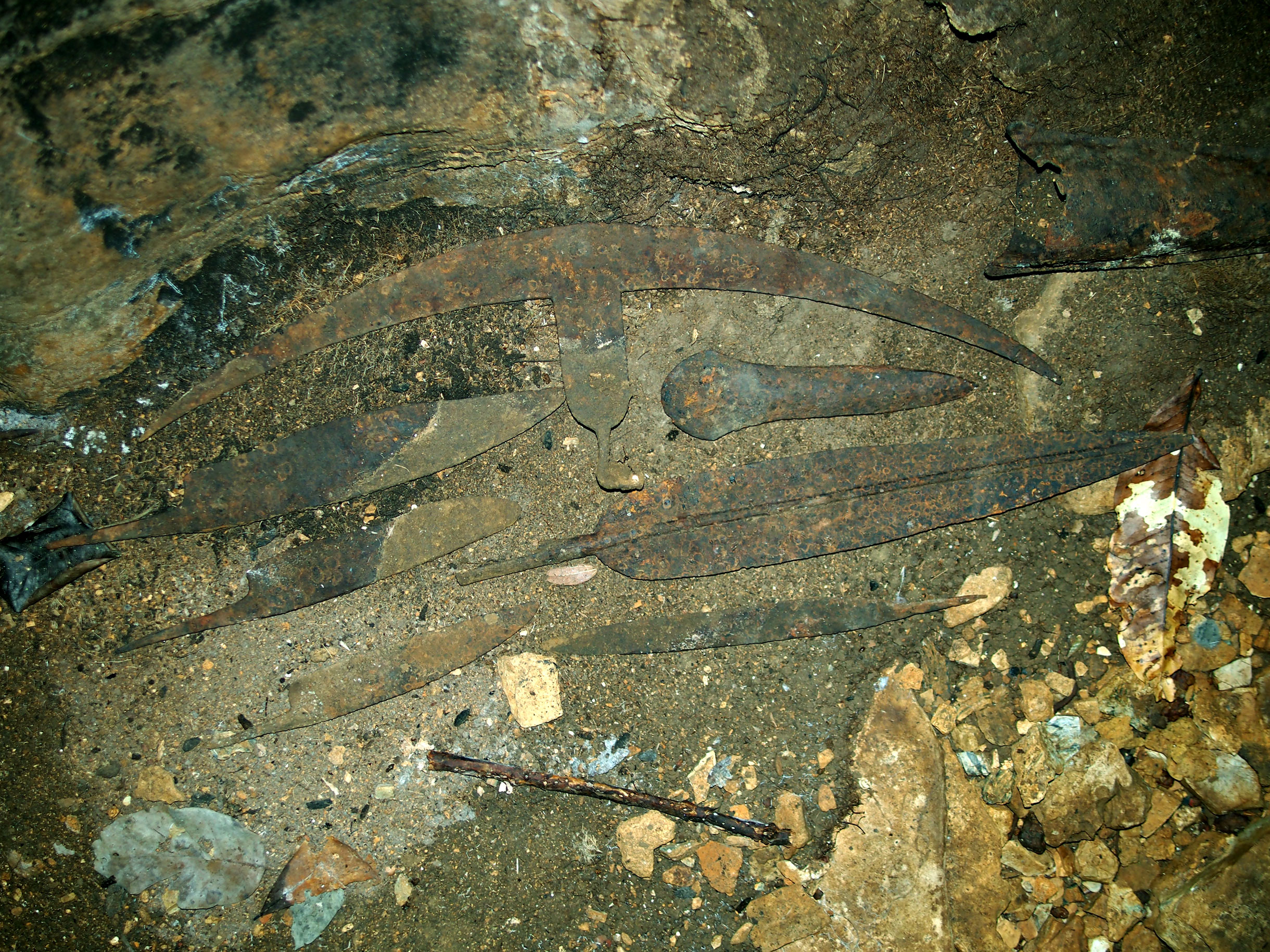
Iron artefacts found on the ground in Iroungou Cave, Gabon, in 2018.
