= Olivier Testa =

French speleologist, explorer and cave diver

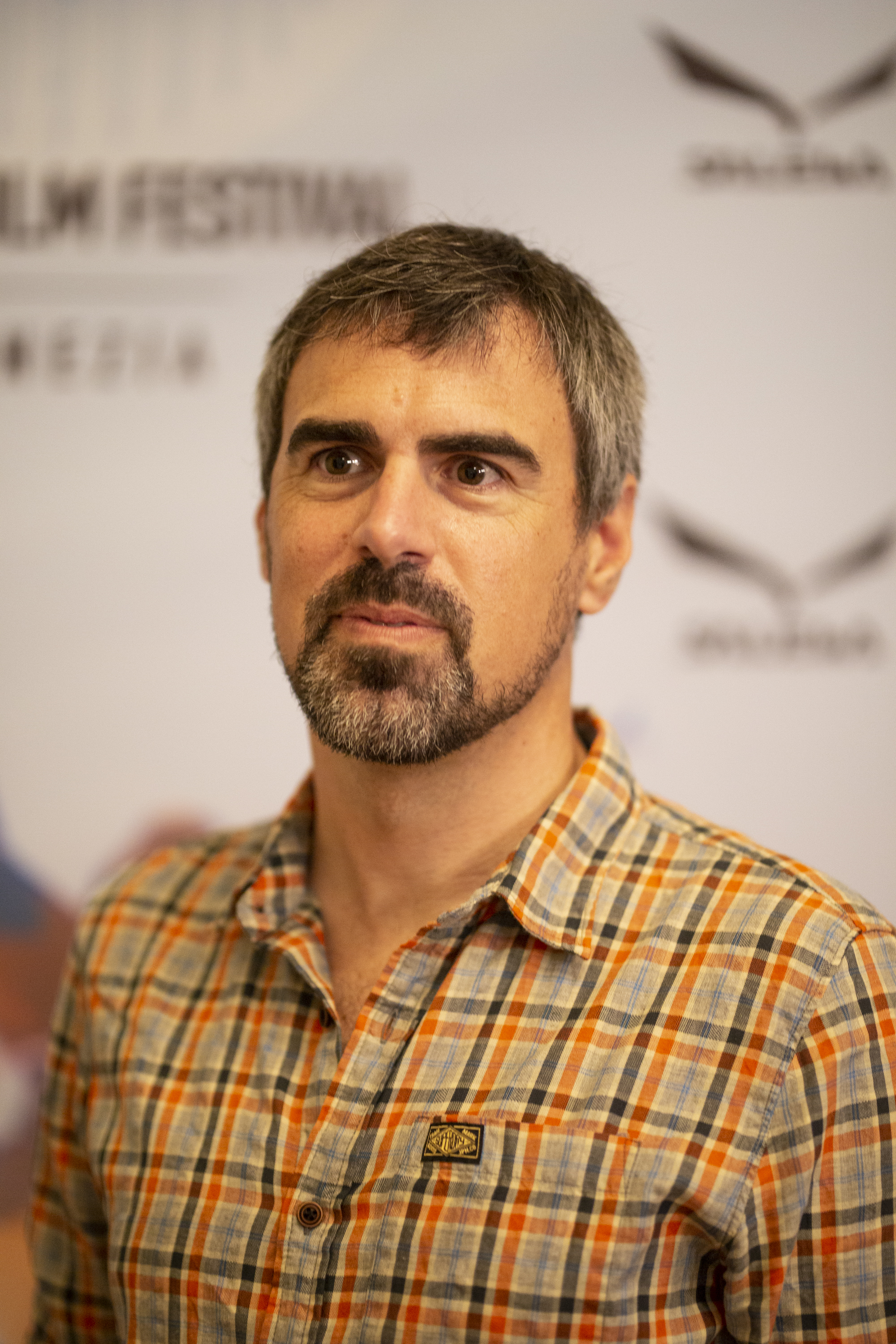
- Testa in 2020
- Born: 1 April 1977 (age 49); Marseille, France]
- Education: École Centrale Paris
- Occupations: Speleologist, Explorer
- Known for: Cave exploration
- Website: www.olivier-testa.com

Olivier Testa (born April 1, 1977) is a French caver, known for his discovery of the orange cave-dwelling crocodiles of Gabon, the Iroungou burial cave in Gabon, the discovery of unexpected caves in the volcanic Bamboutos mountains in Cameroon and several discoveries in Haiti. He has led or participated in over 40 caving expeditions in Africa, Asia and in the Caribbean.

== Early life ==
Testa was born in Marseille, France, and grew up in the Alps, in Annecy, where he learnt mountain sports.

After obtaining an engineer's degree at École Centrale Paris in 2000, Testa tried different jobs and worked 2 years at French Institute for Research in Computer Science and Automation (INRIA) (Real-Time Scheduling), near Grenoble, France, from 2001 to 2003. Meanwhile, he was an active caver at the La Tronche caving club (FLT). He explored and practiced in many deep caves in Chartreuse Mountains and Vercors Massif, and started cave diving.

Testa discovered Africa volunteering for a 2-year mission in Dschang, Cameroon] with AFVP (the French equivalent of Voluntary Service Overseas) in 2006–2007. He was in charge of coordinating the Route des Chefferies cultural program and the preliminary works on the Musée des Civilisations in Dschang. He then worked in Ituri, DR Congo for a Humanitarian NGO.

Since 2009, he is a full-time cave explorer.

== Caving expeditions ==
=== Gabon ===
In 2007, Testa and EEGC team, on an expedition to Gabon, discover in the area of Tchibanga, Nyanga the first cave drawings of the country. Other cave drawings or carvings have been later discovered in other parts of Gabon by Testa and Richard Oslisly, in Lastoursville in 2015 and 2016, and near Mouila in 2018.

In 2010, Testa, with a team led by Oslisly (Shirley, Testa, Sebag, Decaens, Mabicka) went on an expedition in the upstream part of the Fernan Vaz Lagoon, Gabon. In the caves of Abanda, cave-dwelling crocodiles, with a unique orange color, were found and captured by the team. These dwarf crocodiles are trapped in the caves along with 10,000s bats. They live in complete darkness, in liquid guano, feeding mainly on bats and cave crickets. Follow-up expeditions took place in 2011, 2015, 2016, 2017.

In 2013, 2015, 2016, Testa and Oslisly conducted speleological research in the area of Lastoursville, known for a couple of caves since early 20th century. In three expeditions, they explored and surveyed 40 caves in the rainforest surrounding the small town. Among discoveries, new caves (Boukama cave, Missie cave, Moungueke cave), several archeological findings (cave drawings in Koubou cave, carvings in Lipopa cave, some ancient iron currencies in Nzoundou cave, beads and bells in Siyou cave, jasper flints in Youmbidi cave).

In 2018, Testa and Oslisly discovered the sepulchral Iroungou Cave during a speleological expedition in Mouila area. Testa rappeled down a newly discovered cave and set foot in a chamber where he counted 29 human skulls and hundreds of human bones. Hundreds of artifacts made of iron, copper and brass were scattered on the ground : hoe-blade currencies, knife currencies, currency bracelets, bells, and other power objects. The cave has been excavated by archaeologists in 2019.

=== Chile ===
In 2010, Testa was a member of the "Ultima Patagonia 2010" expedition on Madre de Dios Island in Chilean Patagonia.

== Films ==
- Expédition Abanda, à la recherche du crocodile orange (52min, Elodie Fertil, 2011) - Protagonist
- Cave Crocs of Gabon (60min, Graeme Duane, 2018) - Protagonist
- Anba, in the Depth of Haiti (23min, Vladimir Cellier, 2018) - Producer, protagonist
- Africa's Longest Flooded Cave (26min, Phillip Lehman, 2021) - Diver, editor
- Spirits of the Cave 3 (9min, Phillip Lehman, 2019) - Protagonist
