= TR4 =

TR4 may refer to:

- Socket TR4, a CPU socket for AMD processors
- TR4, Tomb Raider: The Last Revelation, the fourth video game in the Tomb Raider series
- TR4, a postal district in the TR postcode area
- TR4, the cow-calf version of the EMD SW7 diesel locomotive
- TR.4, a Canadian turbojet engine
- The TR-4, musician group that recorded with Tommy Rettig
- Travan TR-4, the fourth generation of the Travan mass storage magnetic tape computer backup cartridge
- Triumph TR4, a British sports car
- Fusarium oxysporum f.sp. cubense § Tropical Race 4, a disease of banana plants

== See also ==
- TR (disambiguation)
