= Abanda Caves =

Cave complex in Gabon, located in the upstream of Fernan Vaz Lagoon

The Abanda Caves are a cave complex in Gabon, located in the upstream of Fernan Vaz Lagoon. They were first mentioned by Dr. Marco Marti and Claude Werotte in the early 2000s, and fully explored during several caving expeditions by Oslisly, Testa, Sebag and Shirley.

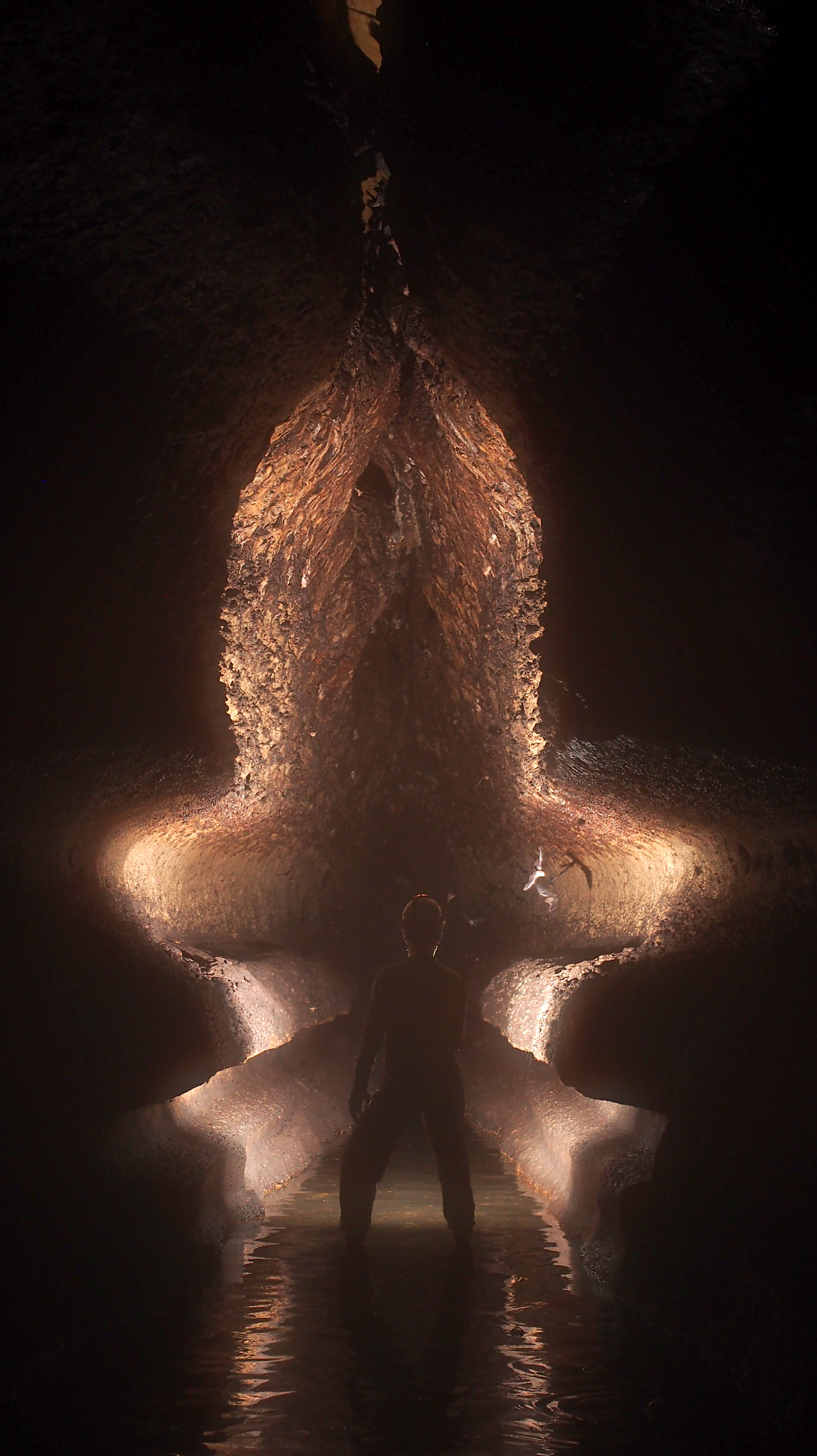
Keyhole-shaped underground passage in the Abanda caves, Gabon, with bats

There are two independent cave networks: the Dinguembou cave (350m) and the Mugumbi cave (400m). Access to the horizontal passages is possible through vertical shafts of about 7m deep. They host large colonies of bats (Egyptian fruit bat, Sundevall's roundleaf bat, Giant roundleaf bat) estimated to more than 100,000 individuals. Picathartes nests have been observed at the entrances of the caves.

The Caves of Abanda are known to host an endemic population of orange-colored cave-dwelling dwarf crocodiles. They were described by herpetologist Matthew H. Shirley after the first scientific expedition in the caves in 2010. These crocodiles live in complete darkness, they feed mostly on bats and cave crickets and swim in liquid bat guano.

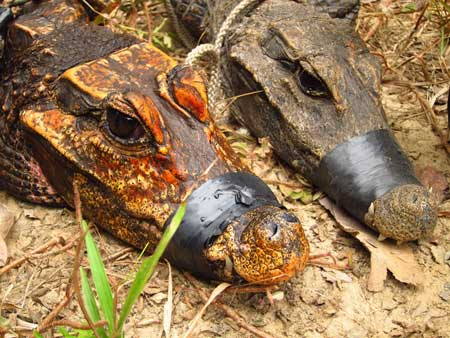
Orange cave-dwelling dwarf crocodile next to a "normal" aboveground individual in Gabon
