= Iron currency =

Iron Age money

Iron currency bars are objects used by Iron Age people to exchange goods.

== Materials ==
The bars were expensive objects, as it would take 25 man-days to produce 1 kg (2.2 lb) of a finished bar, usually shaped with a small socket at one end, and consume 100 kg (220 lb) of charcoal.

== Usage history ==
Iron spits were used as money in Greece before silver currency. Plutarch states Lycurgus withdrew all gold and silver currency so that Spartans could only use iron currency, with a price fixed so that 10 minas worth of currency required a large store-room in the house, and a yoke of cattle to transport it. They retained the cumbersome and impractical rather than proper coins to discourage the pursuit of wealth.

Julius Caesar's Gallic Wars, mentions iron currency in Britain.

"For money they use bronze or gold coins, or iron bars of fixed weights." — Julius Caesar, 54 BC

Iron hoes circulated as money in India, Africa, and Indochina, and were the smallest monetary unit of the Bahnar people. Iron bars became a basic currency unit for trade along the Senegambian coast beginning in the late 16th century.

During the nineteenth century, iron bars circulated as money in the Congo. During the nineteenth century, iron hoes circulated in the remote areas of Sudan. The western Uganda Chiga used hoes as their unit of account without using of them as a medium of exchange or store of value. In Portuguese East Africa a hoe standard replaced a cattle standard, and some hoes circulated only as currency and were never used agriculturally. In the French Congo, iron bars, shovels, hoes, blades, and iron double bells played the role of currency. In mid-nineteenth-century Nigeria, a slave cost 40 iron hoes.

In 1824, 394 currency bars were found, 1.2m below the surface, at a re-used camp on Meon Hill, Mickleton, Gloucestershire.

In 1860, currency bars were discovered at Salmonsbury Camp, Bourton-on-the-Water.

In 1942, Iron currency bars were found around Llyn Cerrig Bach and the surrounding peat bog in Wales.

== See also ==
- Iron currency bar
- Iron currency bracelet
- Tieqian
- Kissi penny
