= Testa (surname) =

Testa is a surname that literally means "head" in Italian. Notable people with the surname include:

- Alberto Testa (dancer) (1922–2019), Italian dancer
- Alberto Testa (lyricist) (1927–2009), Italian composer and lyricist
- Augusto Testa (born 1950), Italian astronomer
- Armando Testa (1917–1992), Italian graphic designer
- Chicco Testa (born 1952), managing director of Rothschild Spa
- Chuck Testa, American taxidermist and Internet meme
- Clorindo Testa (1923–2013), Italian-Argentine architect and artist
- Dante Testa (1861–1923), Italian actor and director
- Eugenio Testa (1892–1957), Italian actor and film director
- Federica Testa (born 1993), Italian-born former competitive ice dancer
- Franco Testa (1938–2025), Italian cyclist
- Frank Testa (1903–2000), American cyclist
- Gianmaria Testa (1958–2016), Italian singer-songwriter
- Gustavo Testa (1886–1969), Italian Cardinal of the Roman Catholic Church
- Joseph Testa (born 1955), New York city mobster
- Karina Testa (born 1981), French actress
- Mary Testa (born 1955), American stage actress
- Mike Testa (born 1976), American politician and lawyer
- Nick Testa (1928–2018), American baseball player and coach
- Olivier Testa (born 1977), French speleologist and explorer
- Philip Testa (1924–1981), American Mafia figure
- Pietro Testa (1611–1650), Italian High Baroque artist
- Salvatore Testa (1956–1984), Italian-American mobster and hitman
- Serge Testa (born 1950), Australian yachtsman
- Tony Testa (born 1987), American choreographer, creative director, educator, and dancer
- Uberto Testa, Roman Catholic Prelate

== See also ==
- Testas, a list of people with the surname
