= Testas =

Testas is a surname. Notable people with the surname include:

- Diego Testas (born 1983), Mexican football manager
- José Testas (born 1942), Portuguese former footballer and manager
- Modeste Testas (1765–1870), Ethiopian woman enslaved and sold to French merchants, grandmother of former president of Haiti François Denys Légitime

== See also ==
- Willem de Famars Testas (1834–1896), Dutch painter, draughtsman, etcher and illustrator
- Testa (disambiguation)
  - Testa (surname)
