= Testa =

Testa may refer to:

== People ==
- Testa (surname)
- Trebatius Testa, 1st century BC jurist of ancient Rome

== Other uses ==
- Testa (botany), a term to describe the seed coat
- Testa, Zanskar, a village in Ladakh, India
- Testa, Hurwitz & Thibeault, a former Boston law firm
- Tesch & Stabenow, a German chemical company notable for its role in the Holocaust
- 11667 Testa, a main-belt asteroid discovered in 1997
- Testa (ceramics), fired clay material, especially crushed brick used in mortar
- Trans European Services for Telematics between Administrations

== See also ==
- Testas, a list of people with the surname
- Teesta River, which flows in India and Bangladesh
- Testo (disambiguation)
