= TR =

TR or tr may stand for

== Arts and entertainment ==
=== Gaming ===
- Tomb Raider, a video game franchise
- Terminal Reality, an American video game developer
- Terran Republic (PlanetSide), a faction in the video game series PlanetSide

=== Music ===
- Korg TR, a variant of the Korg Triton music workstation synthesizer
- Trill, notation for musical ornament
- TR-808, TR-909 etc., 1980s Roland drum machines

== Businesses and organizations ==
- Scoot, IATA code since 2017
- Tiger Airways, IATA code between 2003 and 2017
- Tomahawk Railway, reporting mark
- Transbrasil, IATA airline code until 2001
- Team Rubicon, commonly used abbreviation
- Talyllyn Railway, a Welsh railway
- Thomson Reuters, a Canadian multinational media conglomerate
- Texas Roadhouse, restaurant chain in the United States
- Tokyu Railways. See Tokyu Corporation

== Language ==
- Tr, a digraph
- Turkish language (ISO 639 alpha-1 code "tr")

== People ==
- Theodore Roosevelt, the 26th president of the United States
  - Presidency of Theodore Roosevelt, 1901-1909
  - The USS Theodore Roosevelt (CVN-71), a Nimitz-class aircraft carrier
- T. Rajendar, Indian filmmaker and politician
- T. Ramachandran (writer) (1944–2000), Indian writer who wrote under these initials

== Places ==
- TR postcode area, UK postal code for the Truro area
- Travelers Rest, South Carolina
- ISO 3166-1 alpha-2 country code of Turkey
- Vehicle registration code of Tripura, a state of India

== Transportation ==
- Taiwan Railway, a state-owned conventional railway in Taiwan

== Science, technology, and mathematics ==
=== Biology and medicine ===
- Thyroid hormone receptor, a nuclear receptor
- Tricuspid regurgitation, within the heart
- Repetition time, magnetic resonance imaging
- Taxonomic rank

=== Computing ===
- .tr, the country code top level domain (ccTLD) for Turkey
- tr (Unix), command to transliterate characters
- Table row, an HTML element <tr>...</tr>

=== Vehicles ===
- Thai Rung Union Car
- Toronto Rocket, a rolling stock of the Toronto subway
- Triumph Motor Company. a sports car designation, e.g. TR2
- Ferrari TR (set index), several cars
- Berliet TR, a range of heavy-duty trucks

=== Other uses in science, technology, finance, and mathematics ===
- TR-1, a version of the Lockheed U-2 aircraft
- Technical Report, a type of ISO document
- Trace (linear algebra)
- Ton of refrigeration
- Total return

== Other uses ==
- Textus Receptus: Printed Greek New Testament translation sources
- Training routines (Scientology)
- Tax return
- Tax refund
