= Redhead (disambiguation) =

A redhead is a person with red hair.

Redhead or Red Head may also refer to:

== Arts ==
- Redhead (album), a 2003 album by Bleu
- Redhead (1919 film), a 1919 American silent drama film
- Redhead (1934 film), a 1934 American drama film
- Redhead (1941 film), a 1941 Monogram Pictures comedy/romance
- Redhead (1962 film), a 1962 German-Italian drama film directed by Helmut Käutner
- Redhead (musical), a 1959 musical
  - Redhead (original Broadway cast recording), a 1959 album
- Redheads (1992 film), a 1992 Australian film
- The Red Head (1925 film), a 1925 French silent drama film
- The Red Head (1932 film), a 1932 French drama film
- The Red Head (1952 film), a 1952 French drama film

== People ==
- Albert Redhead (1938–2019), Grenadian lawyer and judge
- Ambrose Redhead (1805–1882), English cricketer
- Brian Redhead (1929–1994), British journalist and broadcaster known for presenting the Today programme
- Doreen Redhead (21st century), Canadian judge in Manitoba
- Edgar Milne-Redhead (1906–1996), British botanist
- Edward Redhead (1902–1967), British politician
- Eric Redhead, Canadian politician
- Georgina Redhead, British television actress
- Janelle Redhead (born 1989), Grenadian sprinter
- Jaylene Redhead (2007–2009), Canadian infanticide victim
- Joel Redhead (born 1986), Grenadian sprinter
- Leigh Redhead (born 1971), Australian writer
- Margaret Hunnam Redhead (1897–1991), philanthropist, first wife of Esmond Harmsworth, 2nd Viscount Rothermere
- Margaret Olive Milne-Redhead (1904–1997), British artist and botanical illustrator
- Mark Redhead (20th and 21st century), British film producer and writer
- Michael Redhead (1929–2020), British philosopher
- Steve Redhead (1952–2018), British scholar and author
- Susan Redhead (born 1962), Grenadian former cricketer
- Theo Redhead (1930–1993), Grenadian cricketer
- William Lancelot Redhead (c1853-1909), coal and horse racing magnate of Carville Hall, Brentford
- Cachointioni (died 1756), or Red Head, Onondaga leader

== Places ==
- Red Head, Florida, a community in the United States
- Redhead, New South Wales, Australia, a suburb of the City of Lake Macquarie

== Biology ==
- Redhead (bird), a North American duck, Aythya americana
- Redhead, colloquial name for female smew ducks
- Redhead, the milkweed plant species Asclepias curassavica

== Other uses ==
- Redheads (matches), a brand of matches sold in Australia
- All-American Red Heads, a professional women's basketball team
- Qizilbash, 15th-century Shi'ite militant group. The word is derived from Turkish kızılbaş, which means red head
- Redhead gauge, an ionization gauge used to measure vacuum
