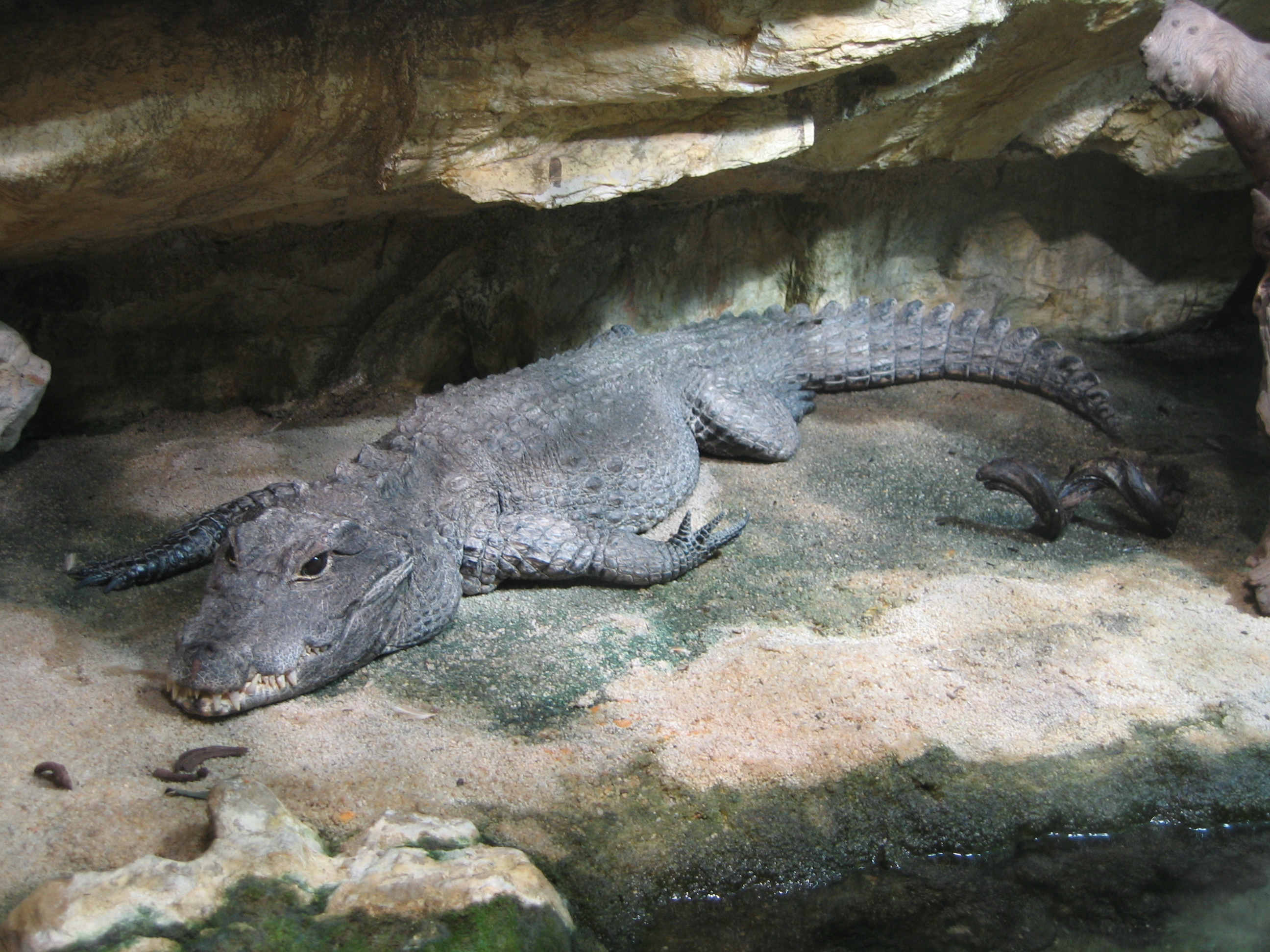
- At Dorée Tropical Aquarium

Conservation status
- Vulnerable (IUCN 3.1)
- CITES Appendix I

Scientific classification
- Kingdom: Animalia
- Phylum: Chordata
- Class: Reptilia
- Order: Crocodylia
- Family: Crocodylidae
- Genus: Osteolaemus
- Species: O. tetraspis

Binomial name
- Osteolaemus tetraspis Cope, 1861
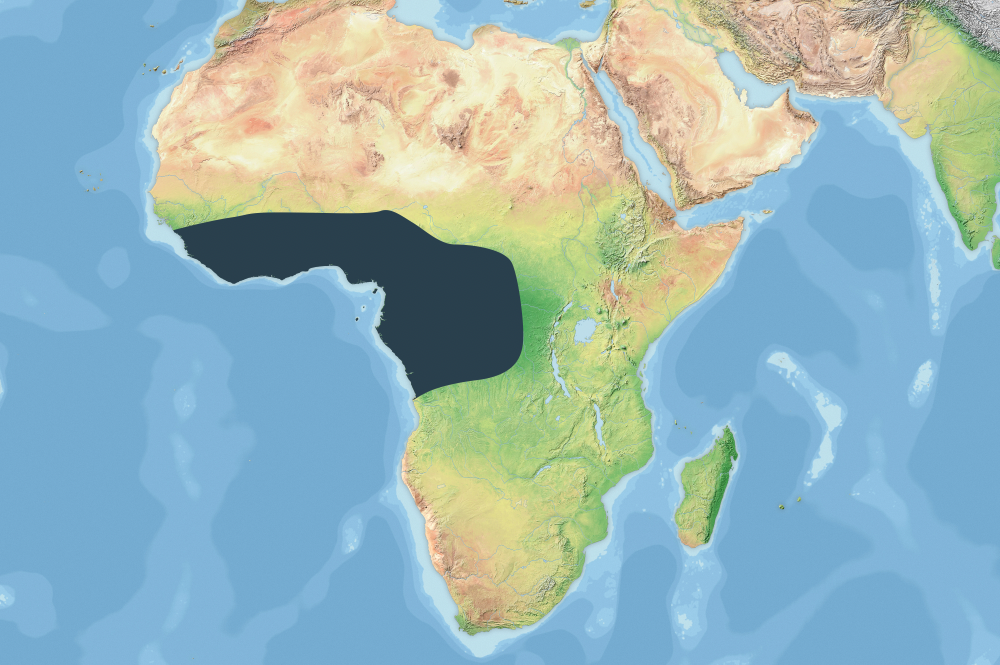
- Range of the dwarf crocodile

Synonyms
- Crocodilus frontatus Murray, 1862; Halcrosia afzelii Lilljeborg, 1867; Halcrosia nigra Gray, 1867

= Dwarf crocodile =

Dwarf crocodile Temporal range: Miocene - Recent, 11.6–0 Ma

Species of reptile

The dwarf crocodile (Osteolaemus tetraspis), also known as the African dwarf crocodile, West African dwarf crocodile, broad-snouted crocodile (a name more often used for the Asian mugger crocodile) or bony crocodile, is an African osteolaemine crocodile that is also the smallest extant living species of crocodile.

== Description ==
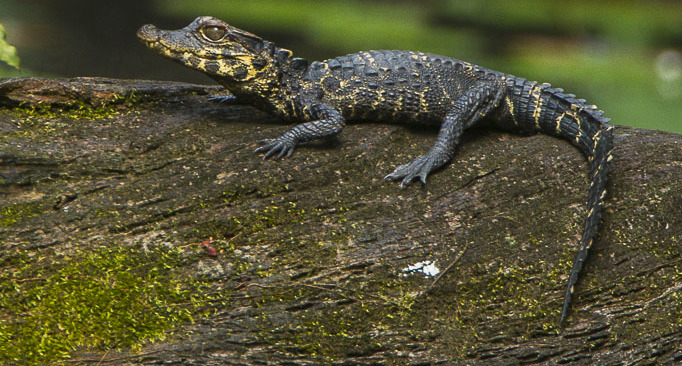
Juvenile in Ghana

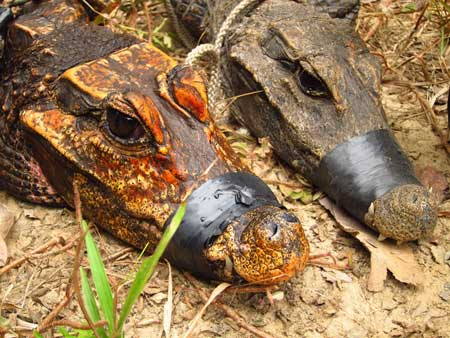
Orange cave-dwelling dwarf crocodile next to a "normal" aboveground individual in Gabon

Dwarf crocodiles attain an adult length of 1.7–1.9 m (5.6–6.2 ft). Adult specimens typically weigh between 18 and 32 kg (40 and 71 lb). This makes it the smallest living crocodile species, although the Cuvier's dwarf caiman (Paleosuchus palpebrosus), a member of the family Alligatoridae, is smaller at up to about 1.7 m (5.6 ft). If the Congo dwarf crocodile (O. osborni) is recognized as a valid species, it would be both the smallest crocodile and the smallest crocodilian since it does not surpass 1.2 m (3.9 ft). Adults are all dark above and on their sides, while the underside is yellowish with black patches.

Some individuals living in the caves of Abanda, Gabon, displayed orange patches, apparently due to alkaline bat guano that erodes the skin of the crocodile. Juveniles have a lighter brown banding on body and tails and yellow patterns on the head.

As a result of its small size and heightened vulnerability to predation, this species of crocodile has a heavily armoured neck, back, and tail and also has osteoderms on its belly and underside of neck.

Osteolaemus has a blunt short snout, as long as it is wide, similar to that of a Cuvier's dwarf caiman, probably a result of occupying a similar ecological niche. The dentition consists of four premaxillary teeth, 12 to 13 on the maxilla, and 14 to 15 on the dentary bone.

O. t. tetraspis has lighter colours, a more pointed, upturned snout, and more body armour than O. t. osborni.

== Distribution and habitat ==
Dwarf crocodiles range across tropical regions of Sub-Saharan West Africa and Central Africa; and they are endemic to the equatorial rainforest rain belt. Such a distribution greatly overlaps with that of the slender-snouted crocodile, encompassing countries as far west as Senegal, reaching Uganda in the east, and ranging as southerly as Angola. The last confirmed record from Uganda was in the 1940s, but whether the species, which is easily overlooked, still survives there is unclear (it was always marginal in this country, only occurring in the far southwest).

Dwarf crocodiles live from lowlands to mid-altitude in streams, small rivers, swamps, pools and mangrove, but generally avoid main sections of large rivers. Most of their range is within forested regions, but it may extend into more open regions where the streams or river are well-shaded. They are also found in seasonally-flooded forest. Unlike most crocodiles, dwarf crocodiles only rarely bask in the sun. During the night they may move some distance from water on land. Reports exist of dwarf crocodiles in isolated pools in the savannah. Dwarf crocodiles living long-term in caves are known from western Gabon, which stand out as an isolated genetic group.

== Biology and behaviour ==
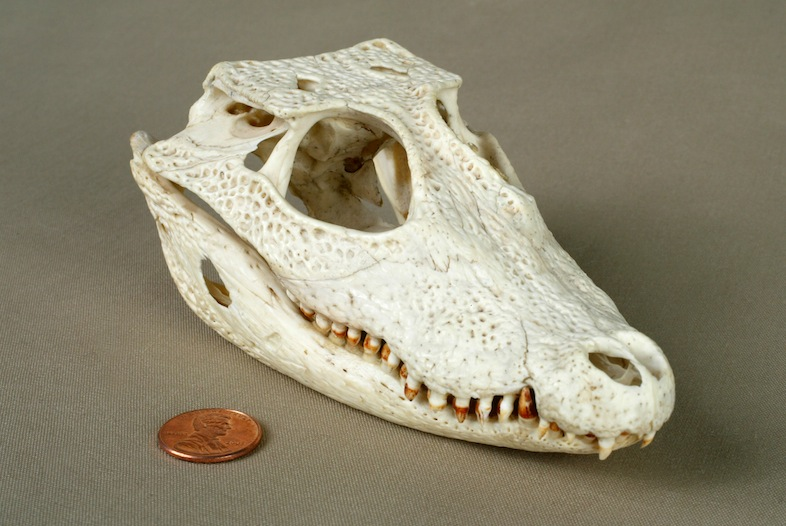
Skull from the collection of the Children's Museum of Indianapolis

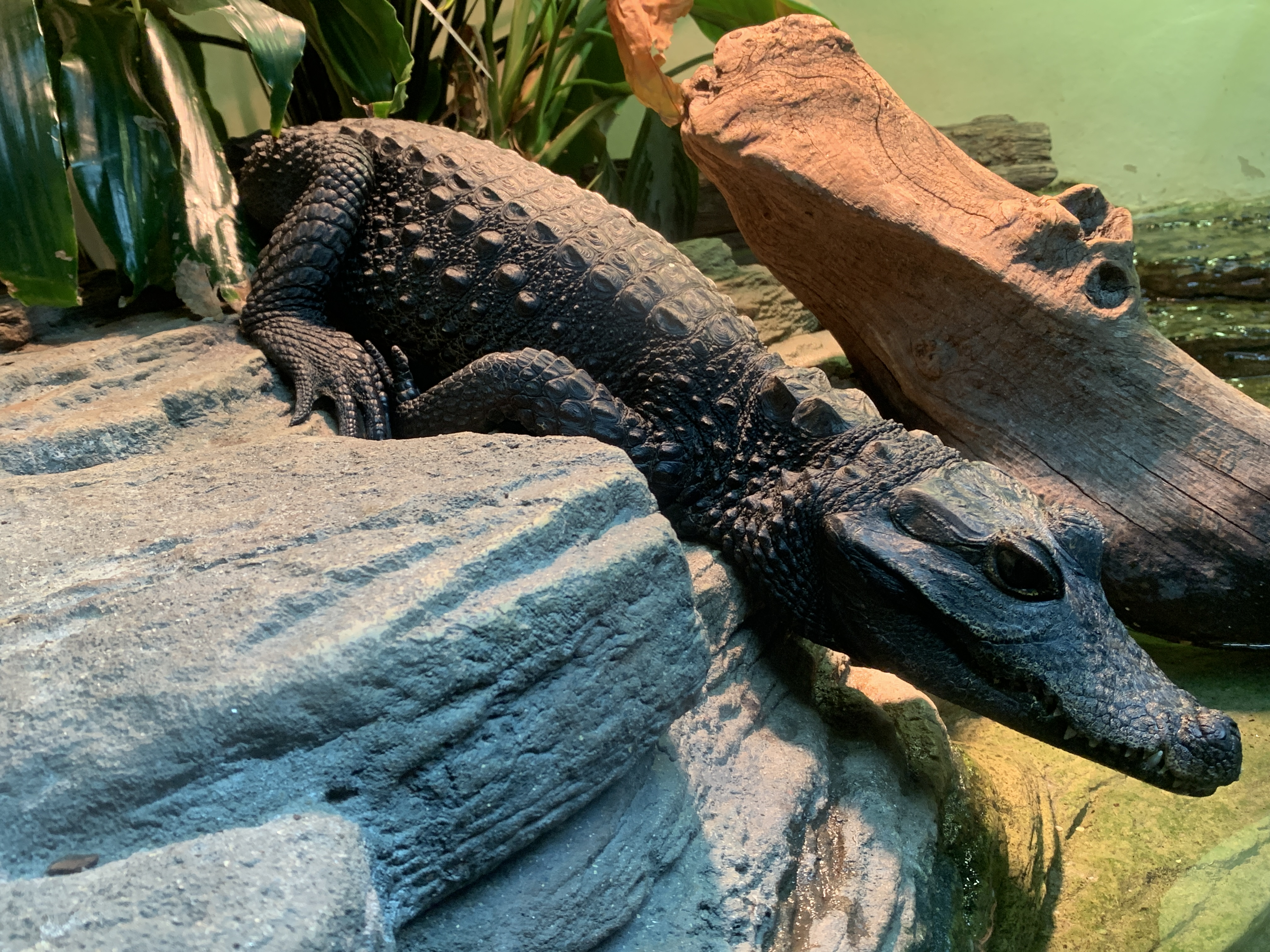
Bronx Zoo

The dwarf crocodile is a timid and mainly nocturnal reptile that spends the day hidden in pools or burrows, although it occasionally may be active during the day. Foraging is mainly done in or near the water, although it is considered to be one of the most terrestrial species of crocodilian and may expand the feeding pattern to land in extensive forays, especially after rains.

Dwarf crocodiles are generalist predators and have been recorded feeding on a wide range of small animals such as fish, crabs, shrimp, frogs, gastropods, millipedes, spiders, insects, juvenile ornate monitors, water birds, bats and shrews.

In a study in the Democratic Republic of the Congo the primary food item was fish, and in a study in Nigeria the primary food items were gastropods and crabs. In the Congo there is a level of seasonality in its diet, changing from fish in the wet season to crustaceans in the dry season, when fish are less available. Plant material has also been found in the stomach of dwarf crocodiles, but it is suspected that this is ingested by accident. They can survive for relatively long periods without food. During the dry season, dwarf crocodiles often retreat to deep holes.

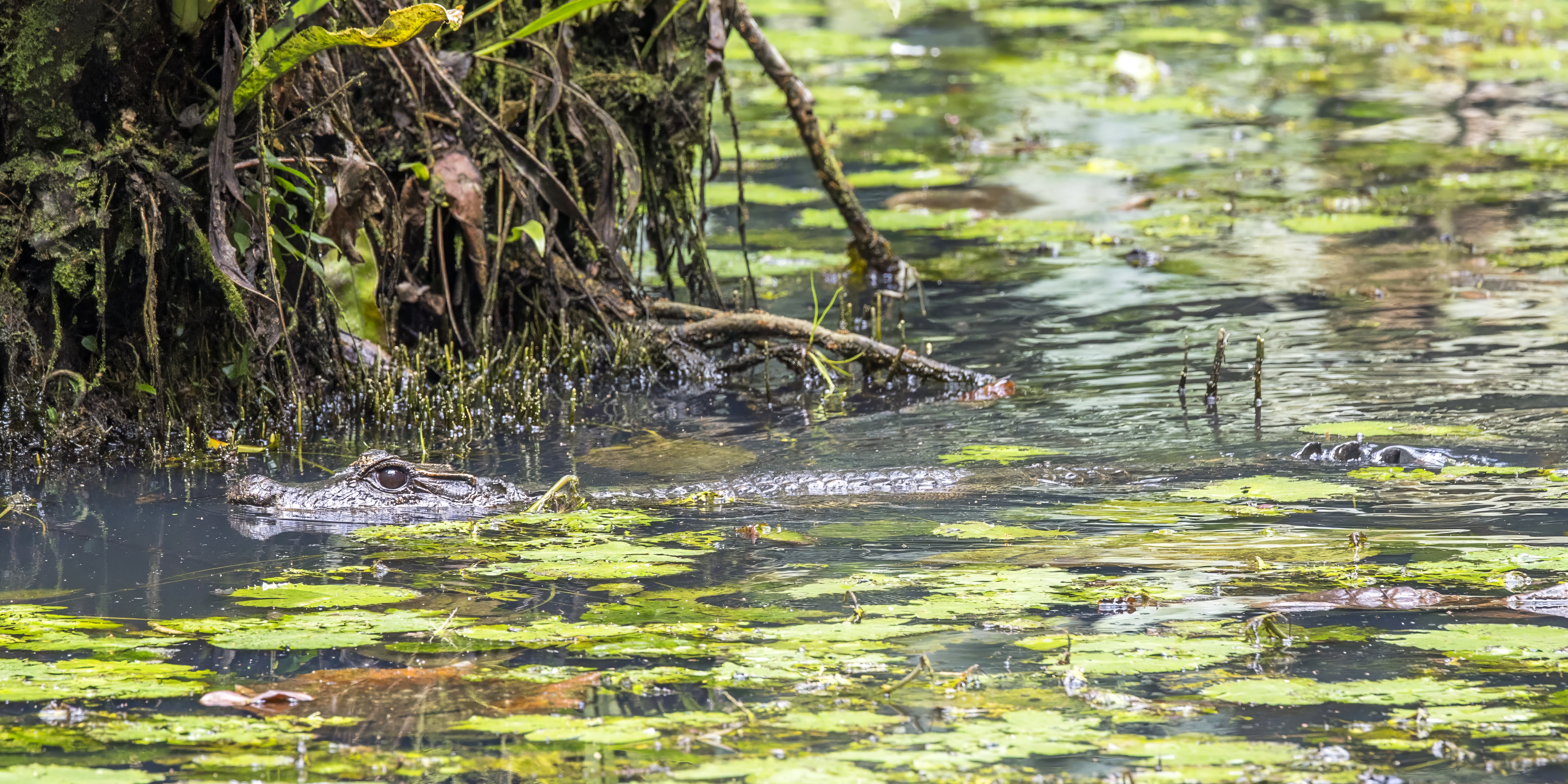
In the wild in Ghana

True to its solitary, nocturnal nature, a dwarf crocodile digs out a burrow in which to hide and rest during the day, which can sometimes have a submerged entrance. An individual lacking the right conditions to do so usually lives between tree roots that hang over the ponds where it lives.

=== Reproduction ===
Interacting closely only in breeding season, female dwarf crocodiles build their nest mounds at the beginning of the wet season, which spans from April - June. The nest, situated near the water, is a mound of wet, decaying vegetation that incubates the eggs due to the heat generated by the decomposition of the plant material. A small number of eggs is laid, usually about 10, though in extreme cases up to 20, and they incubate in 85 to 105 days. Hatchlings measure 28 cm when emerging from the eggs. The female guards the nest during the incubation period, and after the eggs hatch, she watches over the young for an unknown period of time, as young can be eaten by a great range of predators (birds, fish, mammals and reptiles, including other crocodiles).

== Taxonomy and etymology ==
The second species has had a somewhat convoluted taxonomical history. It was first described as Osteoblepharon osborni by Schmidt in 1919, based on a few specimens from the Upper Congo River Basin in what is now the Democratic Republic of Congo. However, Inger in a 1948 paper found the specimens wanting of characteristics that would justify a generic separation from Osteolaemus and referred the specimens to Osteolaemus osborni. In 1961, it was reduced to subspecies rank.

A study of morphology published in 2007, and studies of DNA in 2009, 2013 and 2015 indicate that three distinctly different populations of Osteolaemus may merit full species recognition. These are O. tetraspis (Central Africa, except the Congo River Basin), O. osborni (Congo River Basin), and a third possibly unnamed species (West Africa). Uncertainty exists for the population in Nigeria (between O. tetraspis and the possibly unnamed West African species) as it has not been studied. A fourth clade was found in a study of captives in 2013, but where members of this clade live in the wild is unclear. In some regions the species may come into contact. For example, Cameroon is home to both O. tetraspis and O. osborni.

=== Etymology ===
The genus name, Osteolaemus, means "bony throat", and comea from Ancient Greek όστεον (ósteon), meaning "bone", and λαιμός (laimós), meaning "throat". The genus was named as such due to the osteoderms found among the scales in the neck and belly.

The specific epithet, tetraspis, means "four shields", and derives from Ancient Greek τετρα- (tetra-), meaning "four", and ασπίς (aspís), meaning "shield", as the back of the neck has four large, shield-like scales.

=== Phylogeny ===
A 2018 tip dating study by Lee & Yates simultaneously using morphological, molecular (DNA sequencing), and stratigraphic (fossil age) data established the inter-relationships within Crocodylidae. In 2021, Hekkala et al. were able to use paleogenomics, extracting DNA from the extinct Voay, to better establish the relationships within Crocodylidae, including the subfamilies Crocodylinae and Osteolaeminae.

The below cladogram shows the results of the latest study:

- Crocodylidae (crown group)
  - Osteolaeminae
    - - Mecistops cataphractus West African slender-snouted crocodile
      - Euthecodon†
    - - Brochuchus†
      - - Rimasuchus†
        - - Osteolaemus osborni Osborn's dwarf crocodile
          - Osteolaemus tetraspis Dwarf crocodile
  - Crocodylinae
    - Voay†
    - Crocodylus
      - - - Crocodylus anthropophagus†
          - Crocodylus thorbjarnarsoni†
        - - Crocodylus palaeindicus†
          - Crocodylus Tirari Desert†
      - - - - Crocodylus johnstoni Freshwater crocodile
            - - Crocodylus novaeguineae New Guinea crocodile
              - Crocodylus mindorensis Philippine crocodile
          - - Crocodylus porosus Saltwater crocodile
            - - Crocodylus siamensis Siamese crocodile
              - Crocodylus palustris Mugger crocodile
        - - - Crocodylus checchiai†
            - Crocodylus falconensis†
          - - Crocodylus suchus West African crocodile
            - - Crocodylus niloticus Nile crocodile
              - - - Crocodylus moreletii Morelet's crocodile
                  - Crocodylus rhombifer Cuban crocodile
                - - Crocodylus intermedius Orinoco crocodile
                  - Crocodylus acutus American crocodile

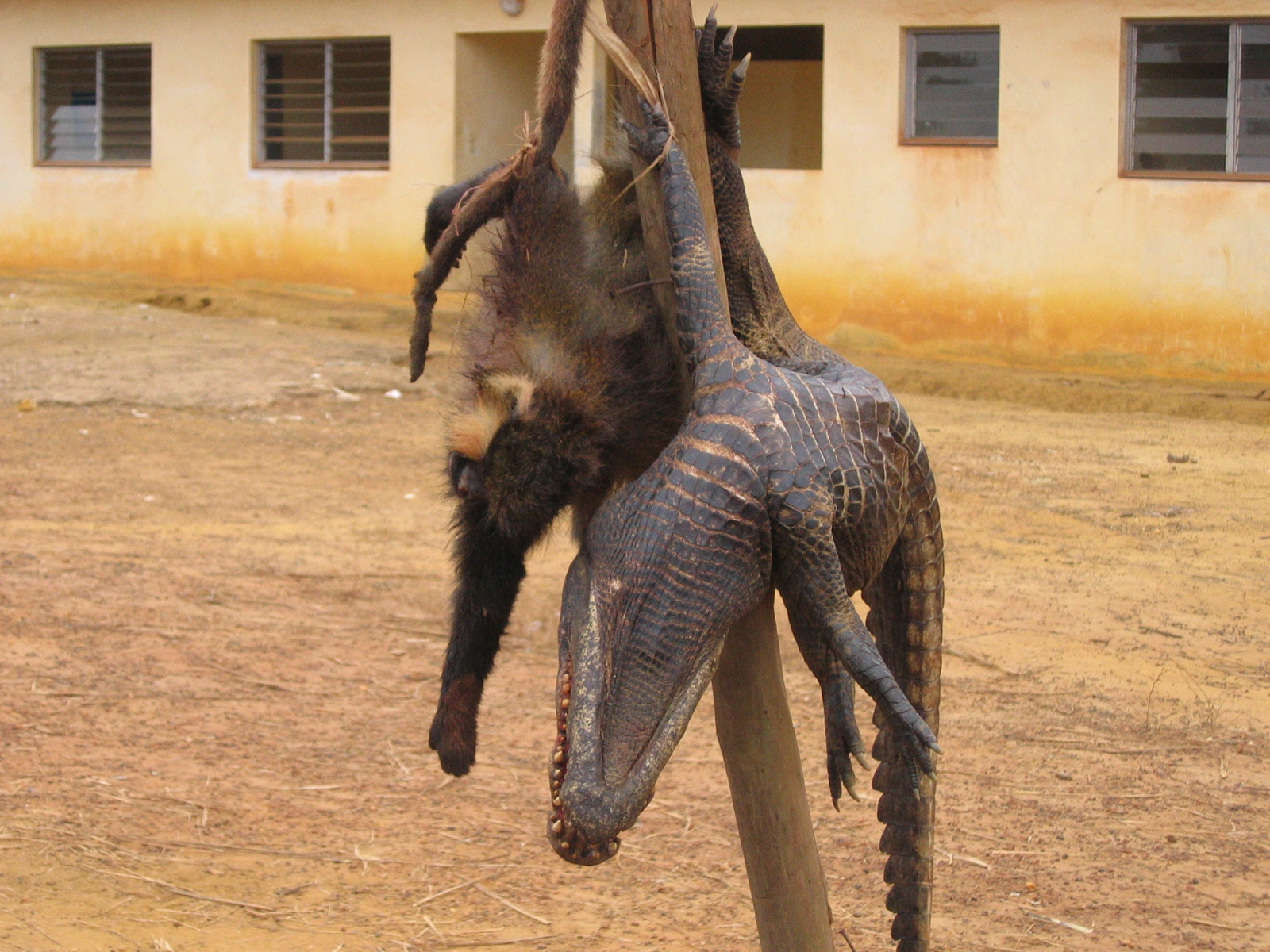
Carcass hanging with monkey

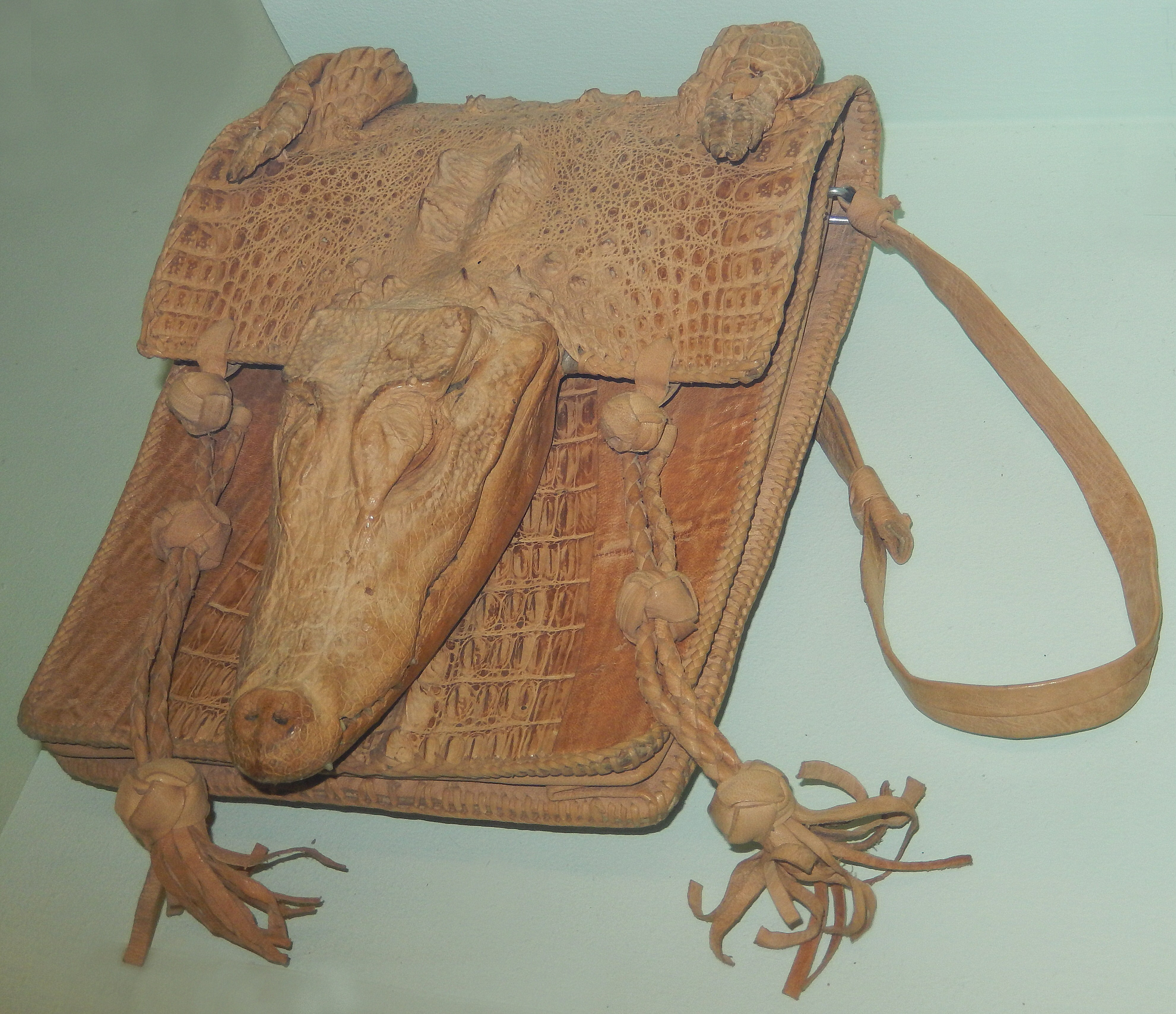
Handbag of dwarf crocodile leather, Natural History Museum, London

== Conservation ==
The dwarf crocodile is considered vulnerable by the IUCN, and it is listed on Appendix I of CITES. It is a little-known species, so unlike their more studied relatives, conservationists are often not as aware of how their populations are faring under the growing human pressure over the ecosystems where they abide. Survey data, when available, show some degree of decline, either by hunting for bushmeat or habitat loss due to deforestation. However, it is a widely spread, and presumably numerous overall. In some regions the populations remain healthy, but in others (such as Gambia and Liberia) it has seriously declined and may risk extirpation. Dwarf crocodiles occur in several protected reserves.

Though some skins are used in local manufacturing of leather products, they are of poor quality, so little interest is shown in captive breeding or a sustainable use program. In contrast, they are sometimes hunted for food and part of the bushmeat trade.

Dwarf crocodiles are widely kept and bred in zoos. Based on a study of individuals kept in AZA zoos, captives in North America are primarily O. tetrapis and the possibly unnamed West African species, but there are also some hybrids. Another study of individuals kept at EAZA zoos revealed a similar picture for Europe, but also that there were a few individuals of the fourth clade (native range in the wild unknown) and a single O. osborni.

== Gallery ==
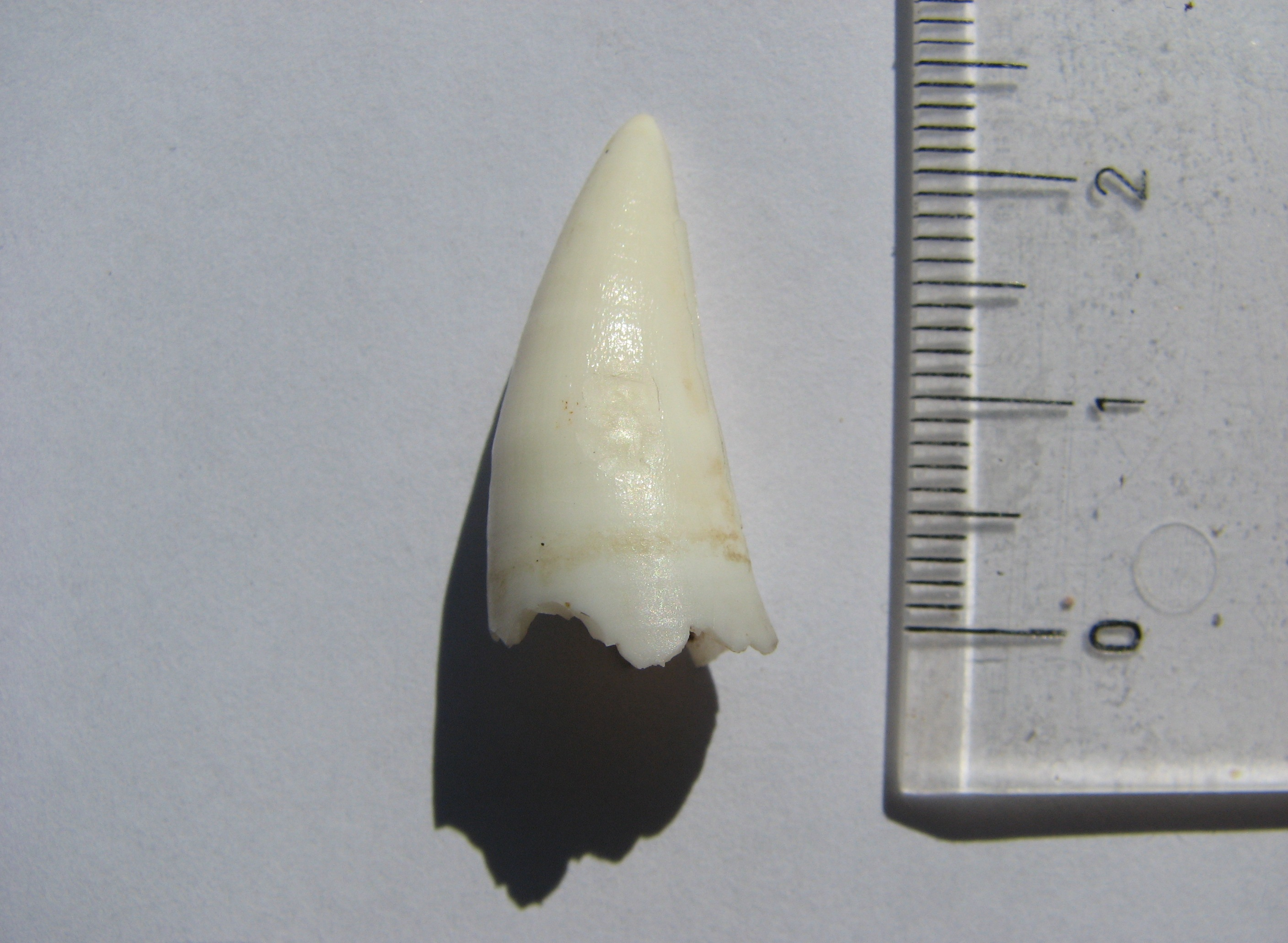
Tooth

Bronx Zoo, US

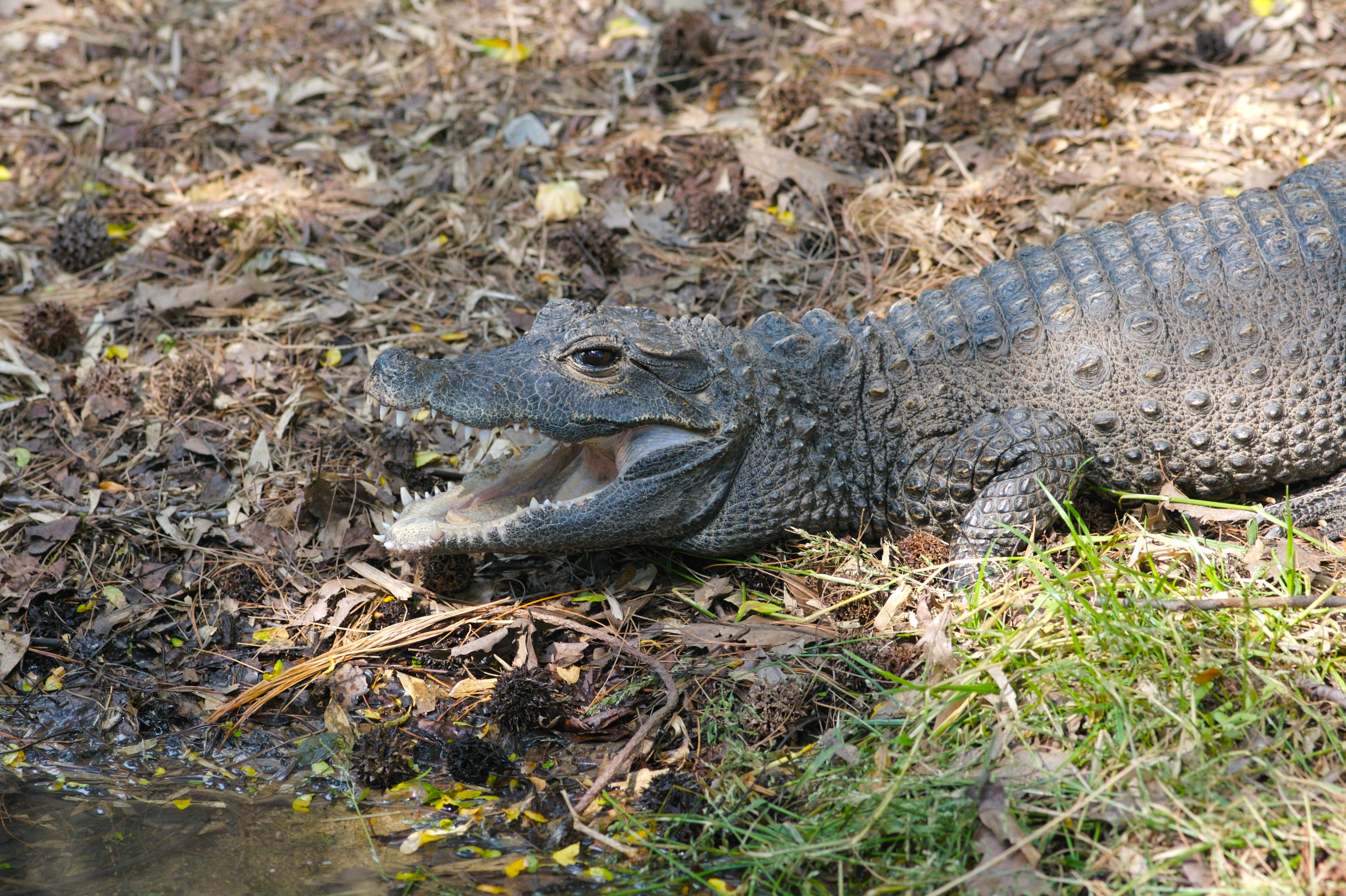
Pittsburgh Zoo, US

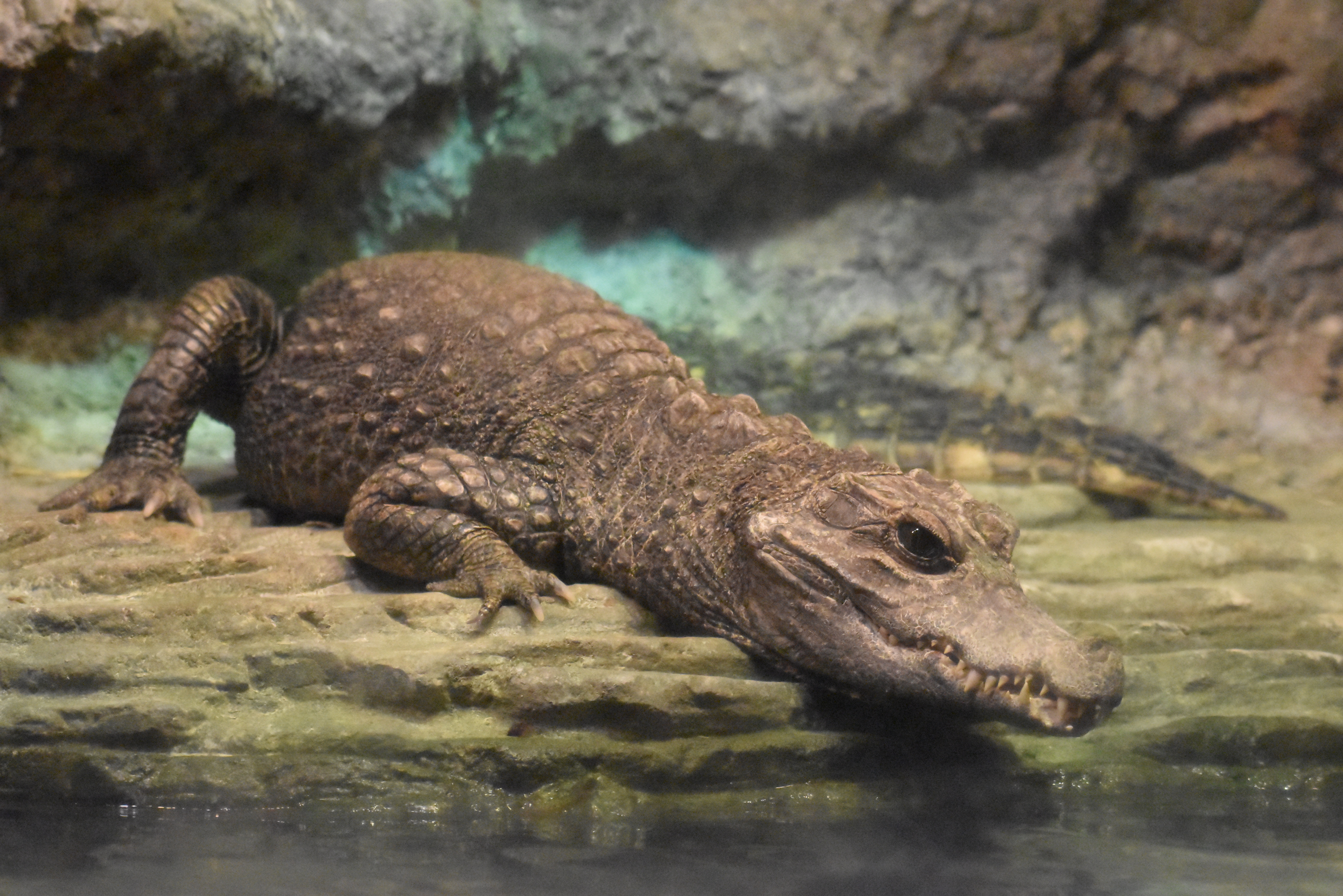
Cleveland Zoo, US

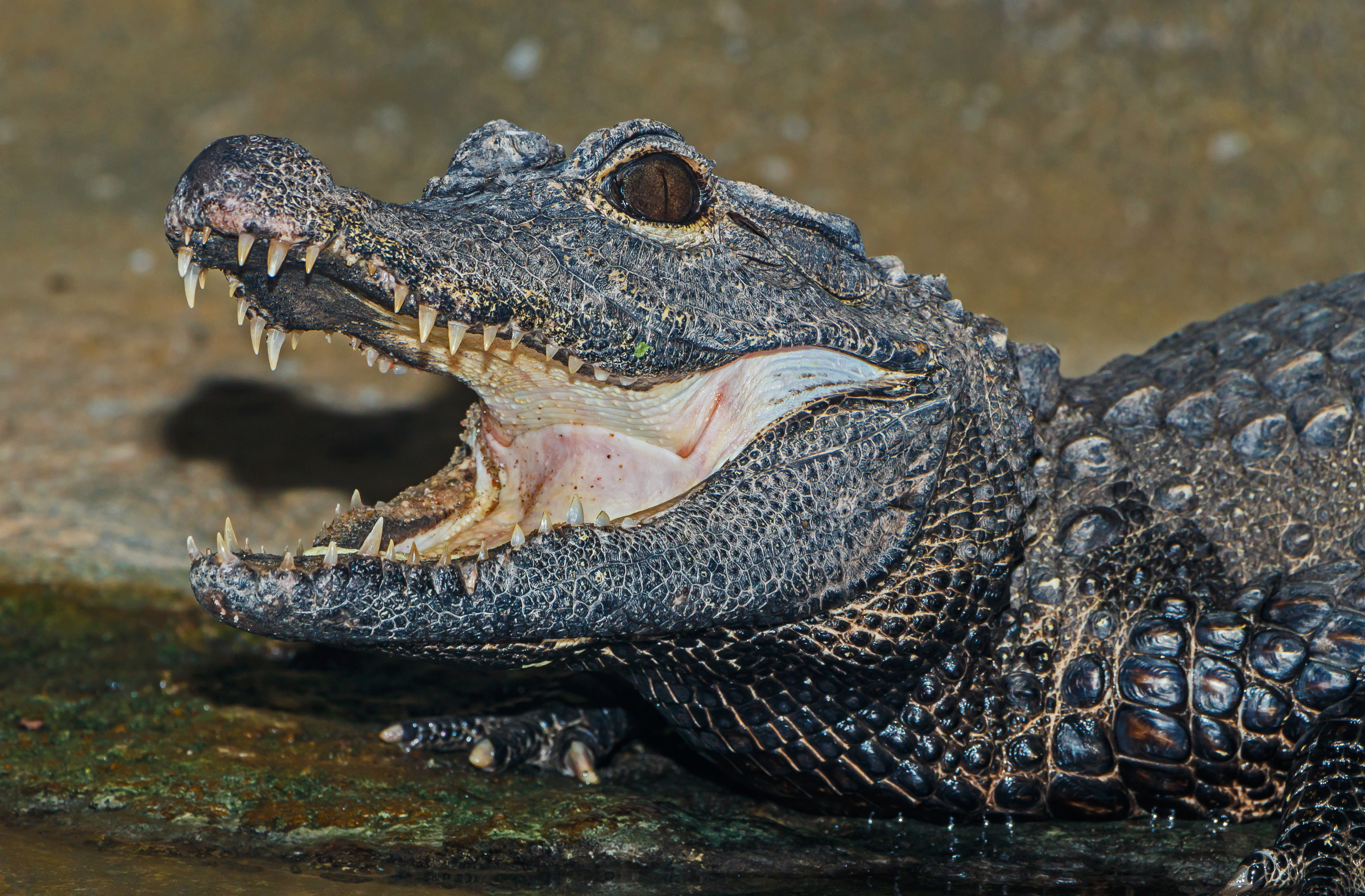
Karlsruhe Zoo, Germany

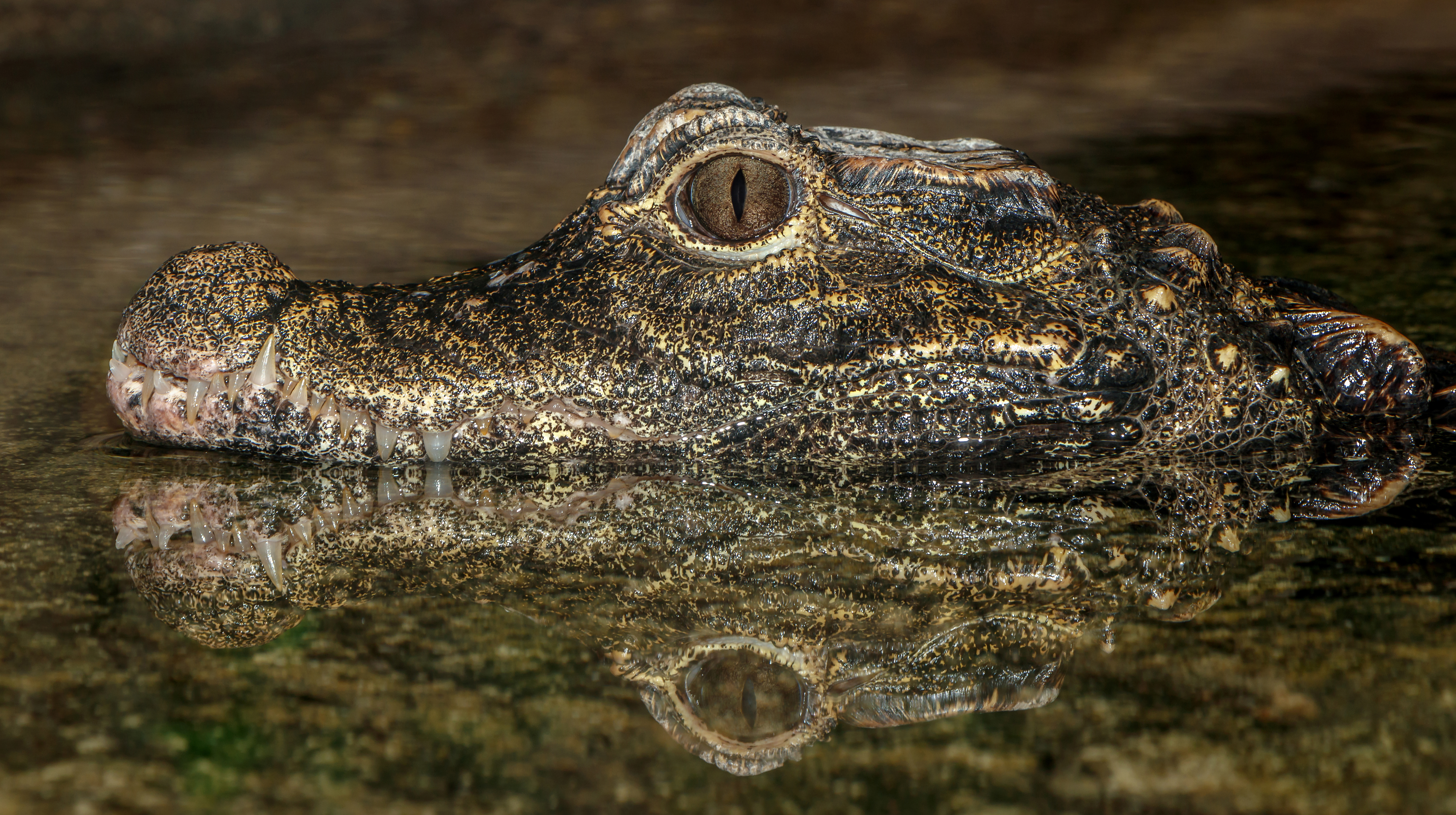
Karlsruhe Zoo, Germany

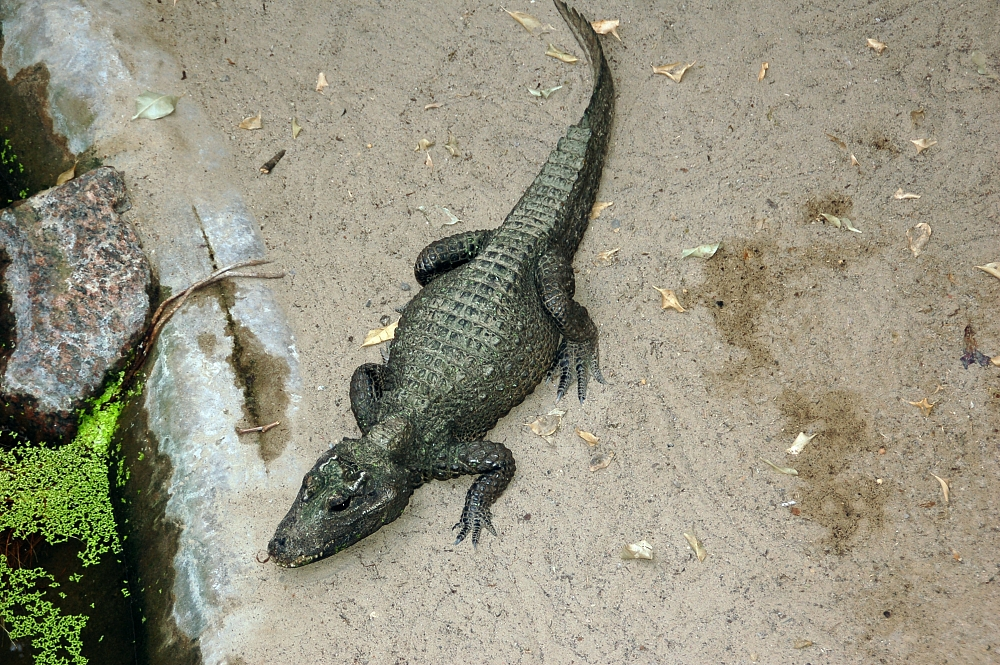
Berlin Zoological Garden, Germany

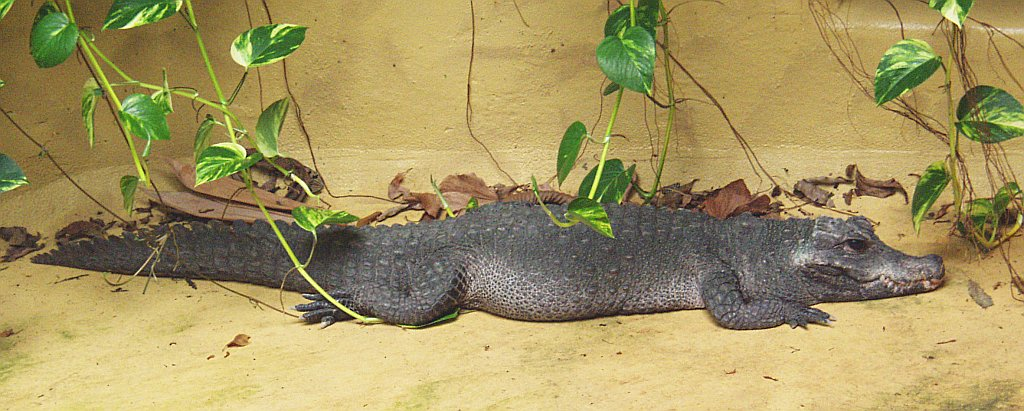
Aquazoo Löbbecke Museum, Germany

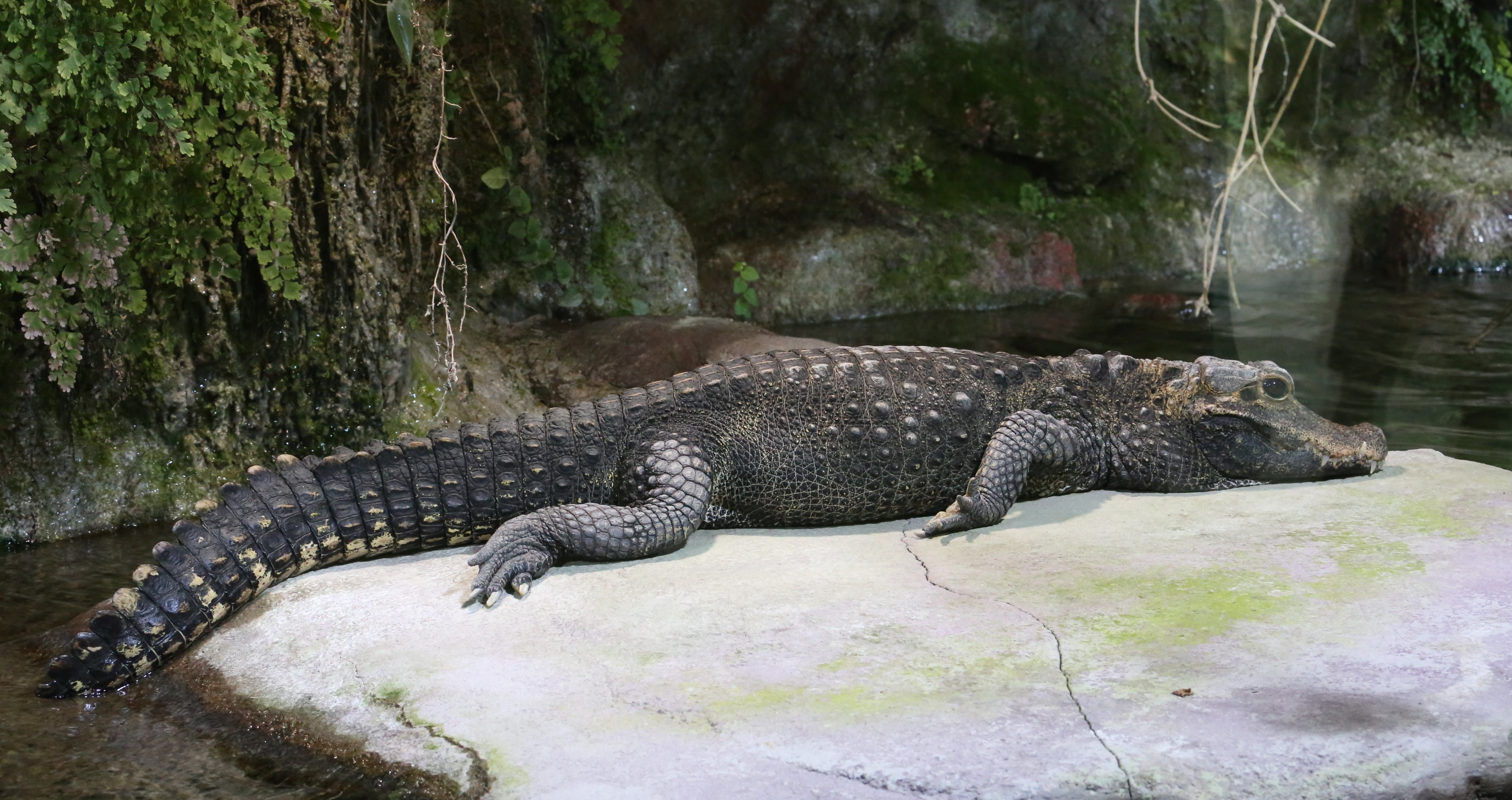
Tierpark Hellabrunn, Germany

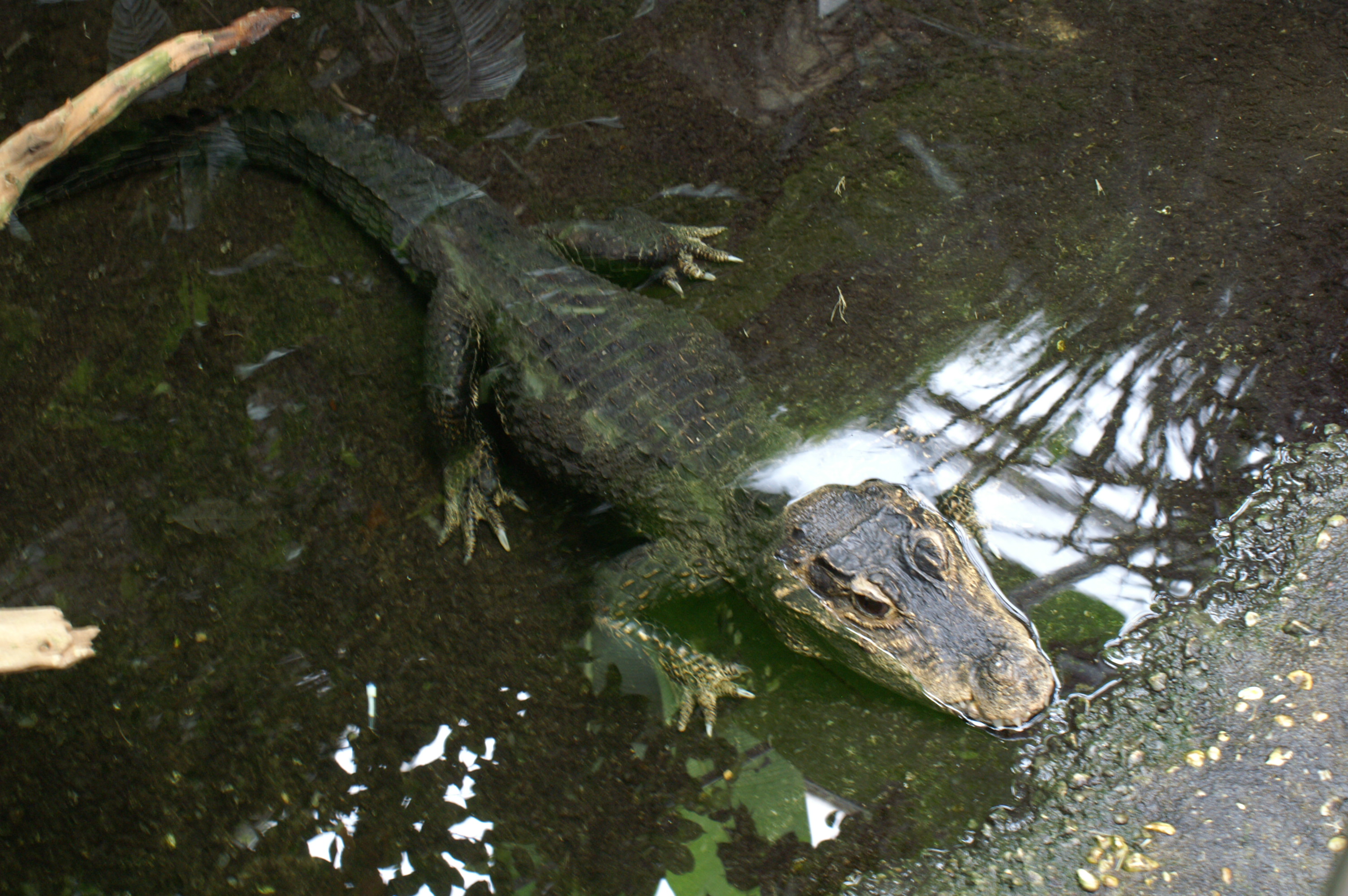
Tierpark Dählhölzli, Switzerland

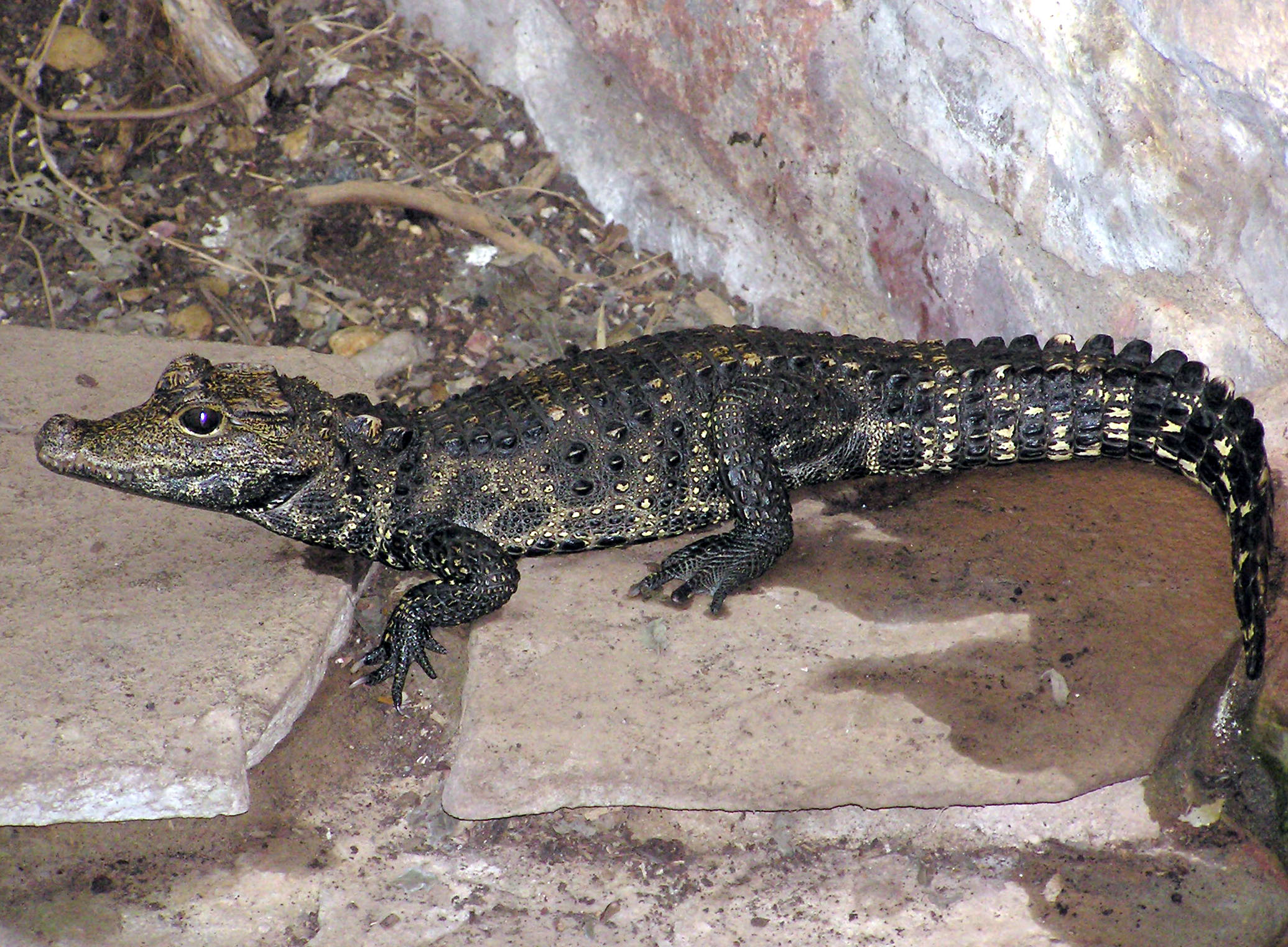
Bristol Zoo, UK

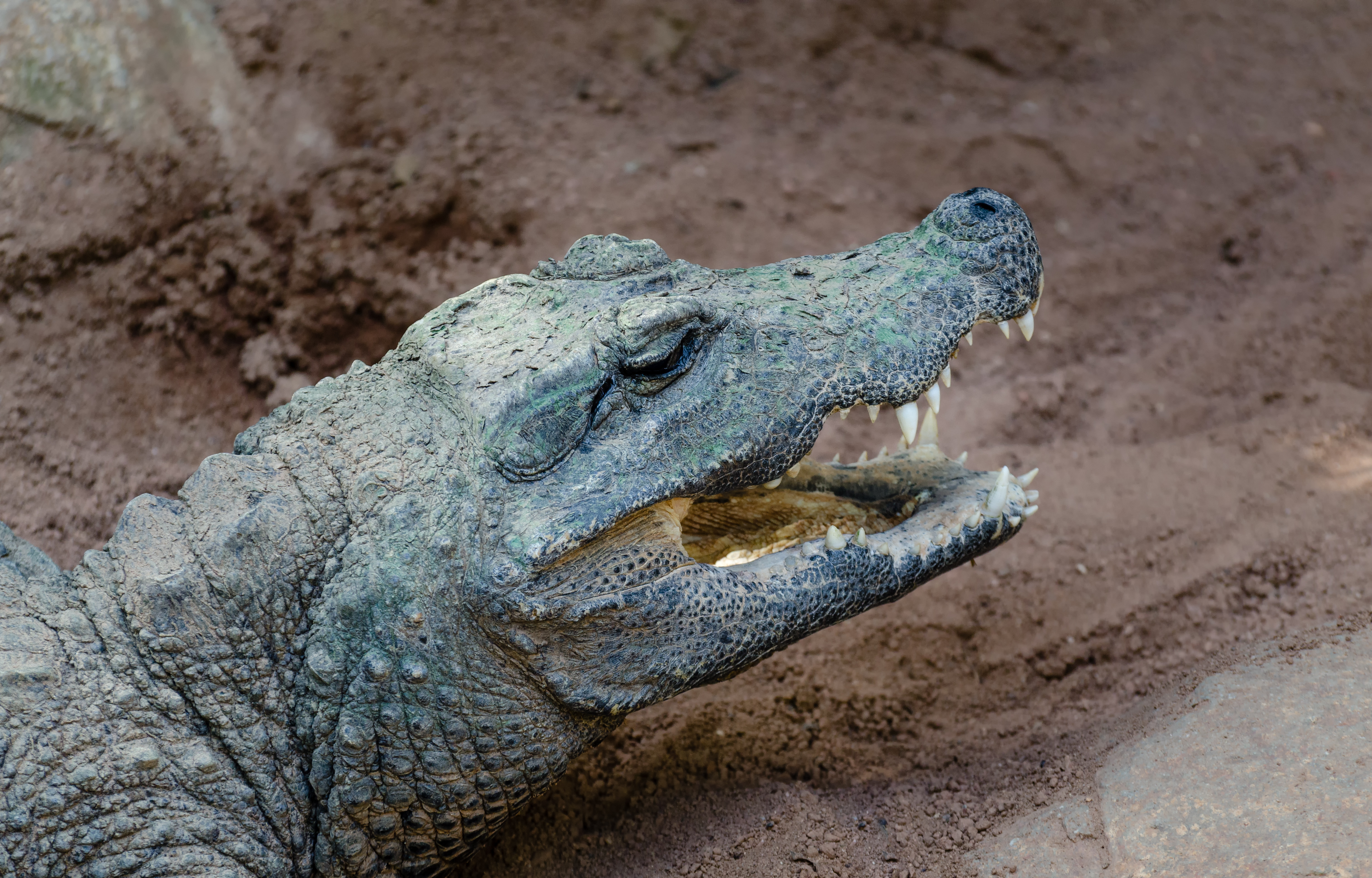
Bioparc in Fuengirola, Spain

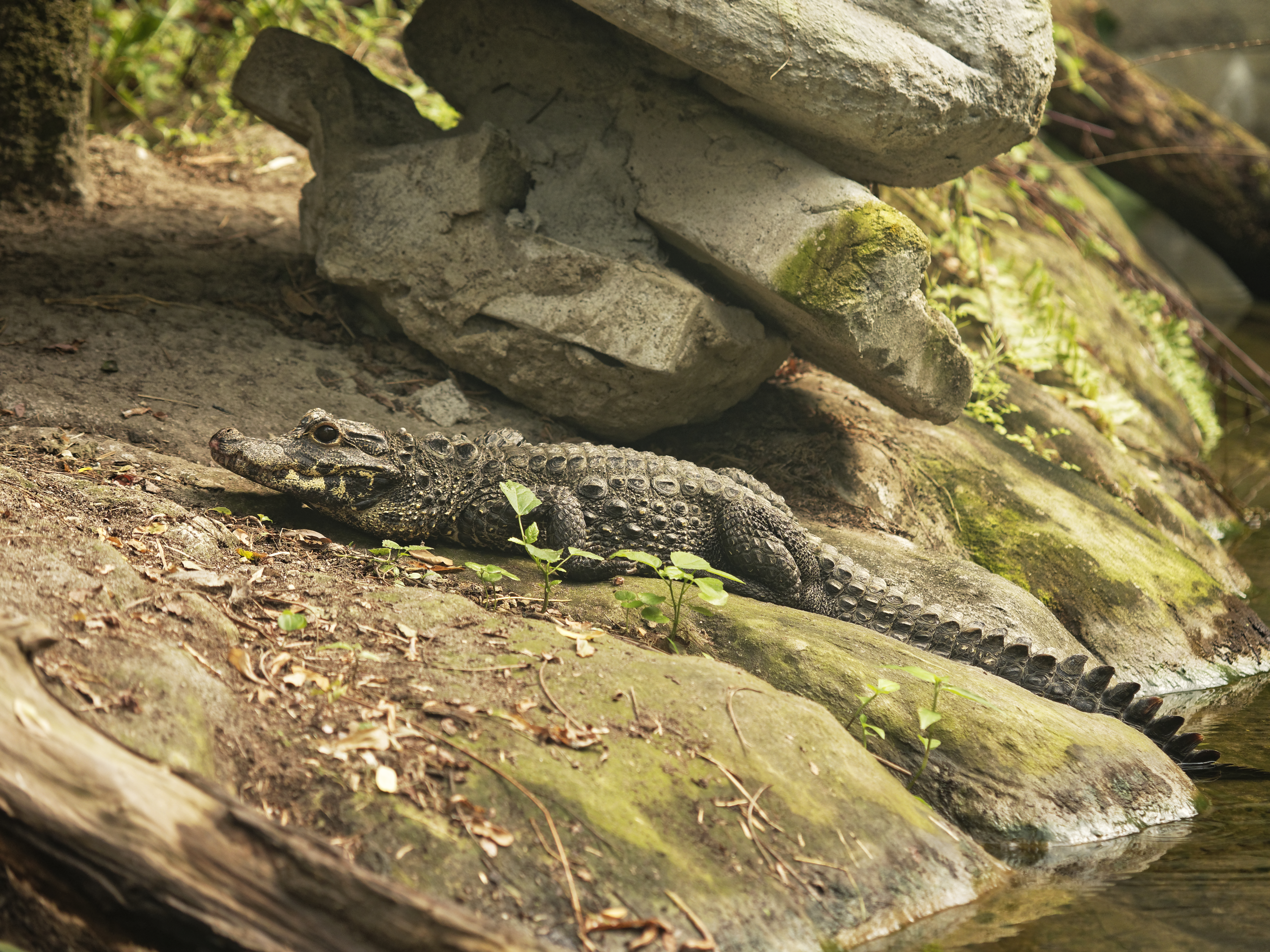
Wildlands Adventure Zoo, Netherlands

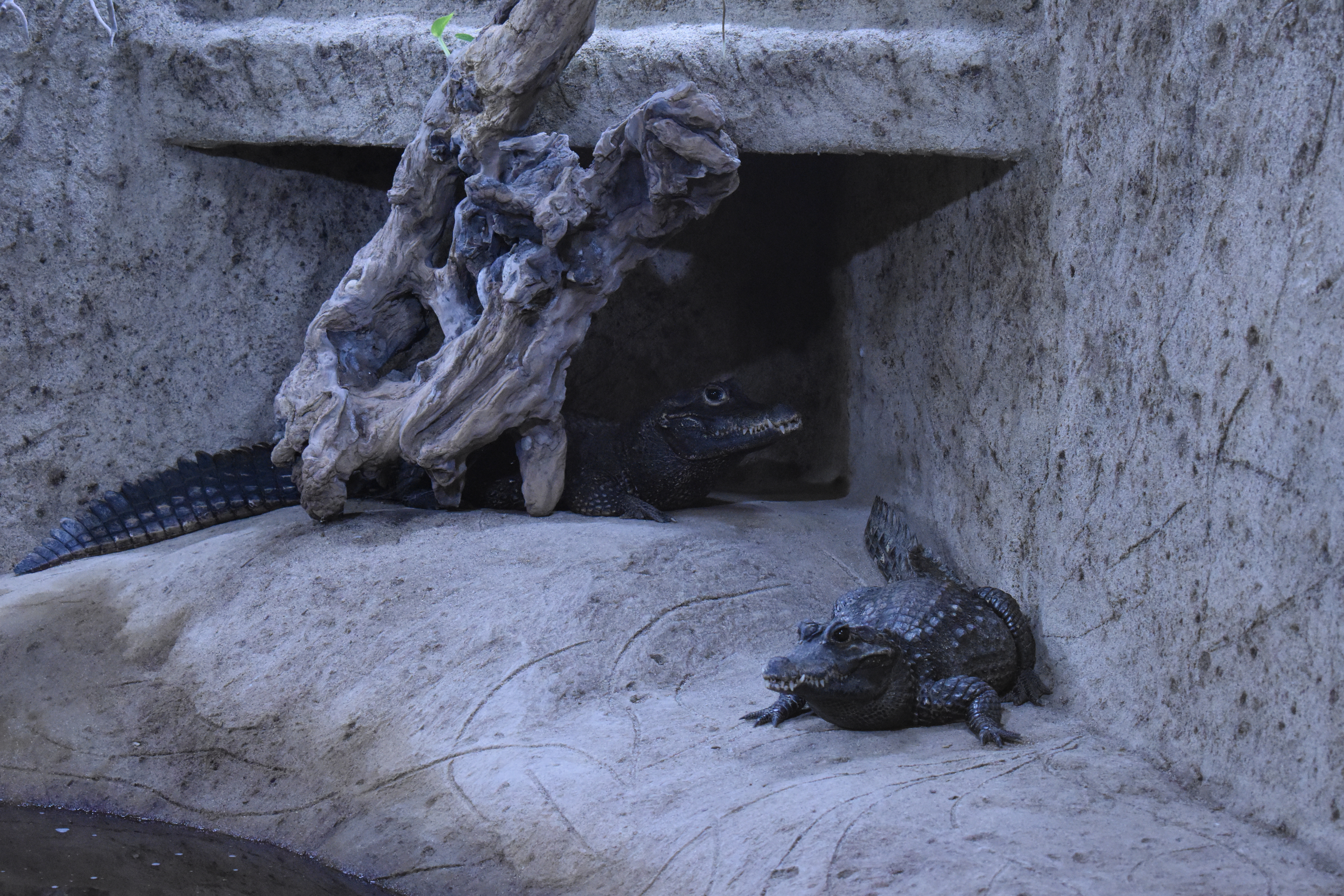
Reptilarium du Larzac, France

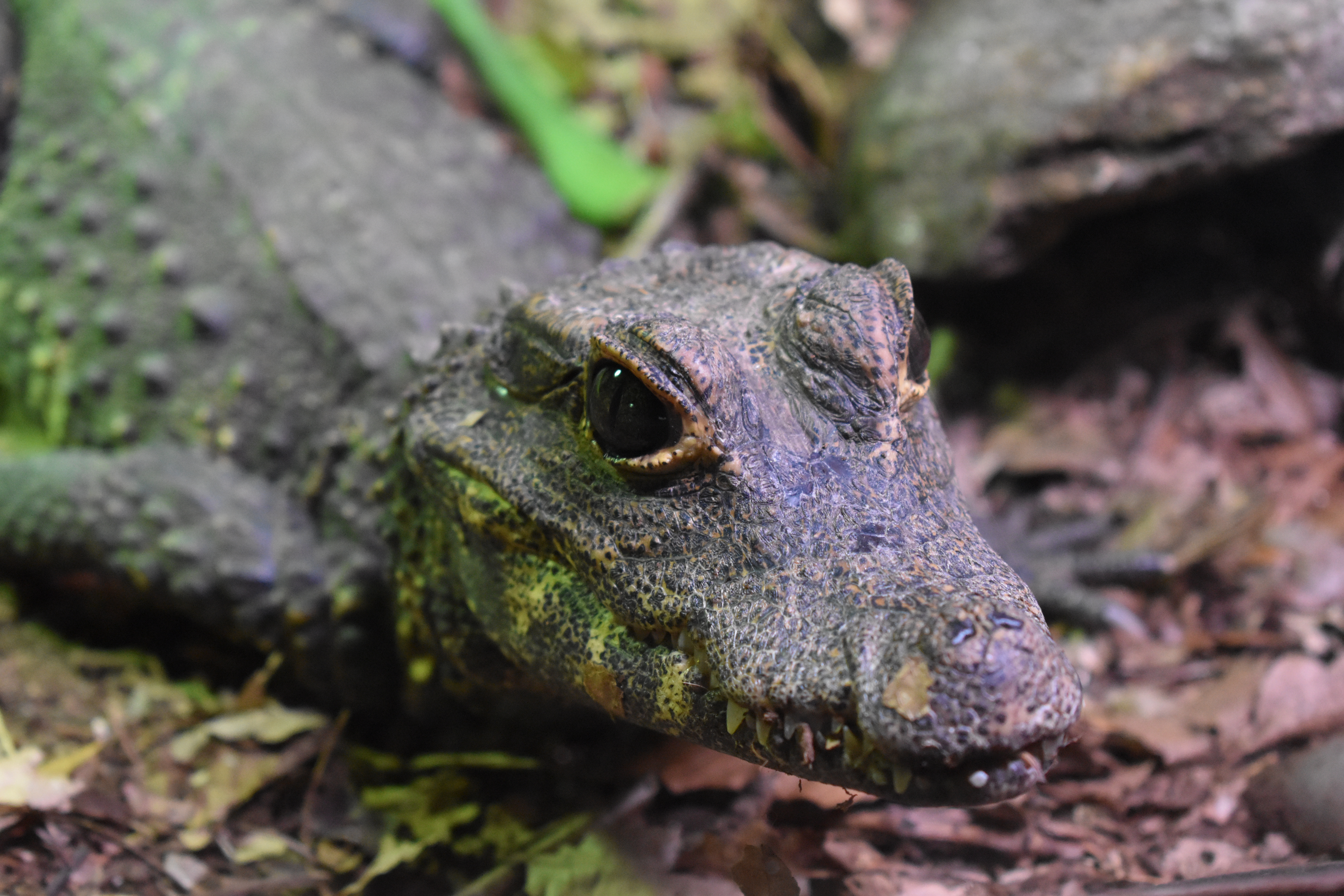
Five-year-old female, at Micro Zoo de Saint Malo, France

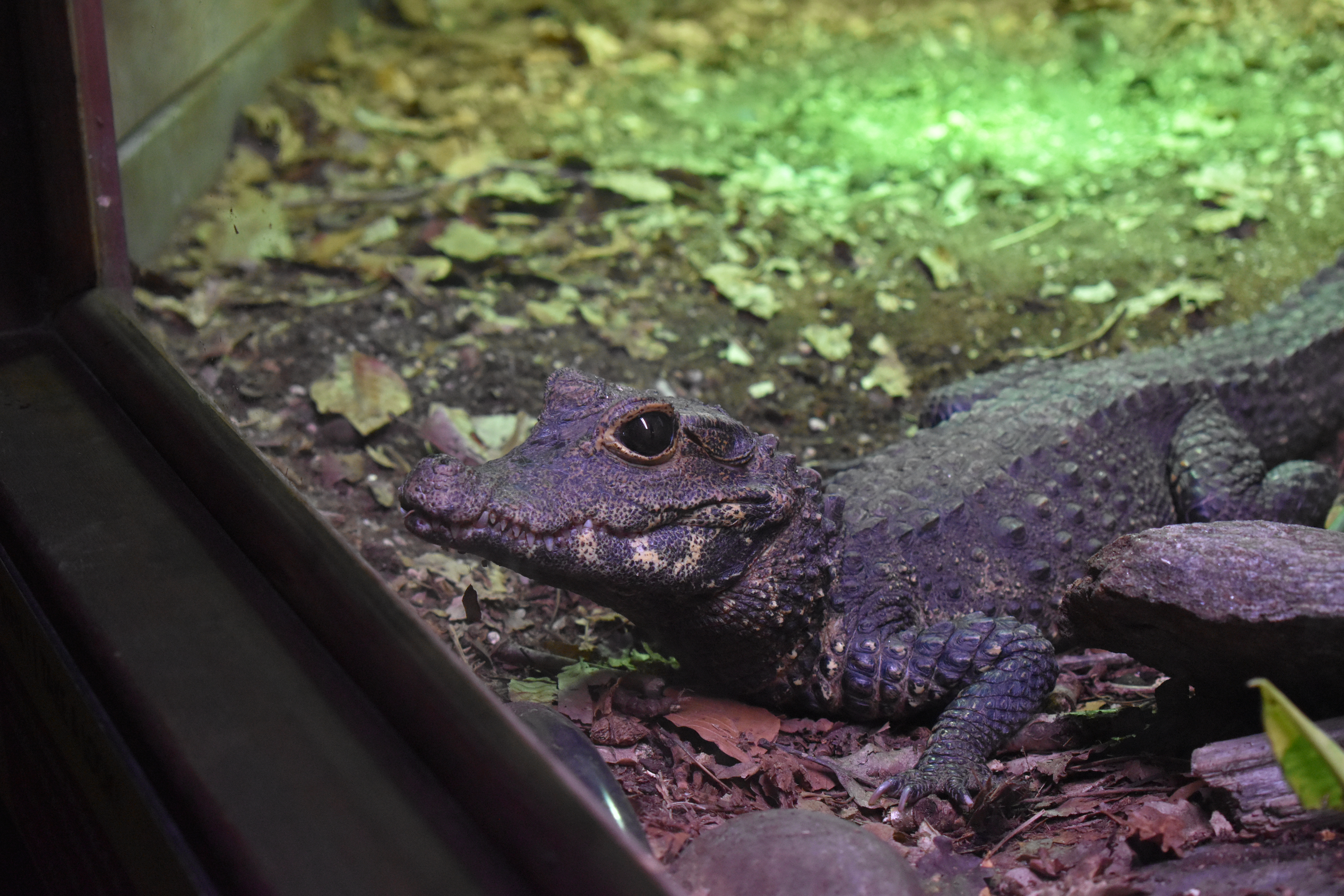
Five-year-old female, at Micro Zoo de Saint Malo, France

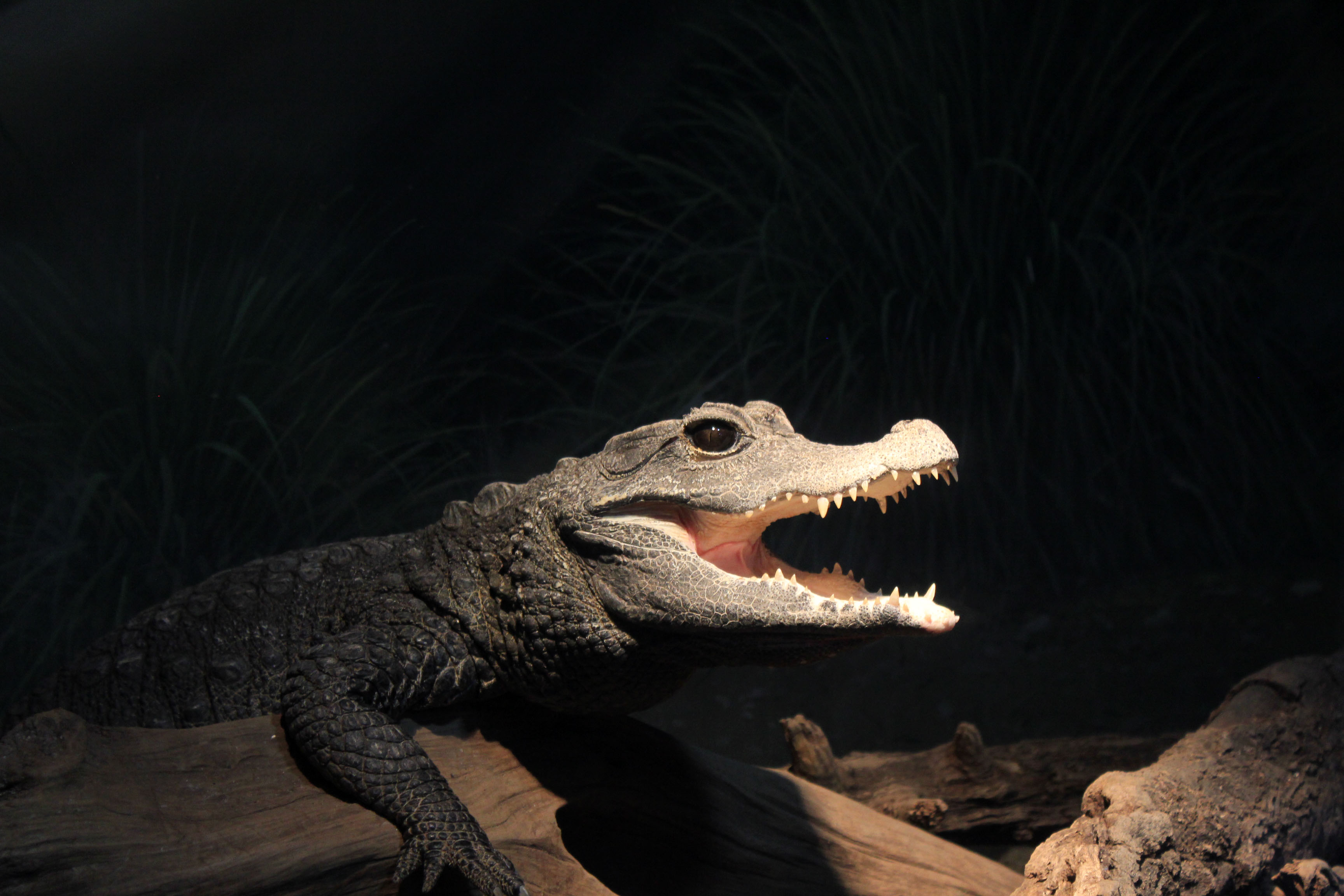

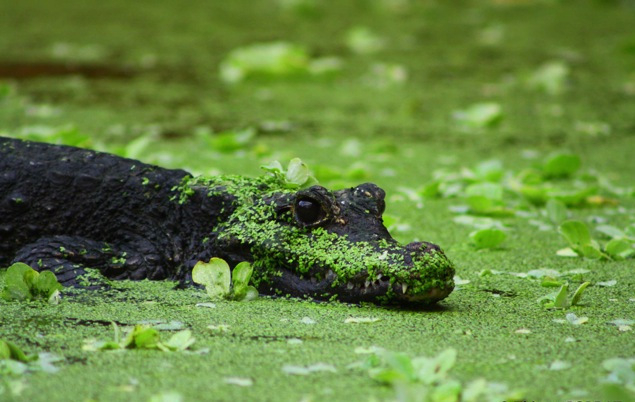
