= African hoe money =

African hoe money was a form of currency which became standard in many African countries.

Implements such as hoes, spades, trowels, knives and spears served a utilitarian function in many African countries. The scarcity of metals such as iron, copper, brass and bronze meant that they became useful trading materials leading to their use as currency. Objects made from these metals came in the shape of a heart, spade, paddle, teardrop, trowel, anchor or blade, often reworked into implements as needed.
