= Cachointioni =

Onondaga speaker and councilman

Kakȣenthiony (also spelled Cachointioni and other variations) (died June 1756), also known as Red Head, was an important member of the Onondaga council, and official speaker of the Onondagas.
