= Fernan Vaz Lagoon =

Lake in Gabon

Coordinates: 1.5924°S 9.4291°E

Fernan Vaz Lagoon is a large lagoon on the Atlantic coast of Gabon. It is named for Fernão Vaz, the first European to reach it, and is known its wildlife and for the church at Mission Saint Anne, built in 1889 by Gustav Eiffel. The main settlement on the lagoon's shore is Omboué.
