= Ferrari TR (set index) =

Ferrari TR may refer to:

- Ferrari 500 TR (1956; Ferrari 500 Testa Rossa) racing sports car
- Ferrari 250 TR (1957–1961; Ferrari 250 Testa Rossa) racing sports car
- Ferrari Testarossa (1984–1991; Ferrari F110 Testarossa), street-legal supercar; sometimes shortened to "TR"
- Ferrari 512 TR (1991–1994; Ferrari 512 Testa Rossa), street-legal supercar
