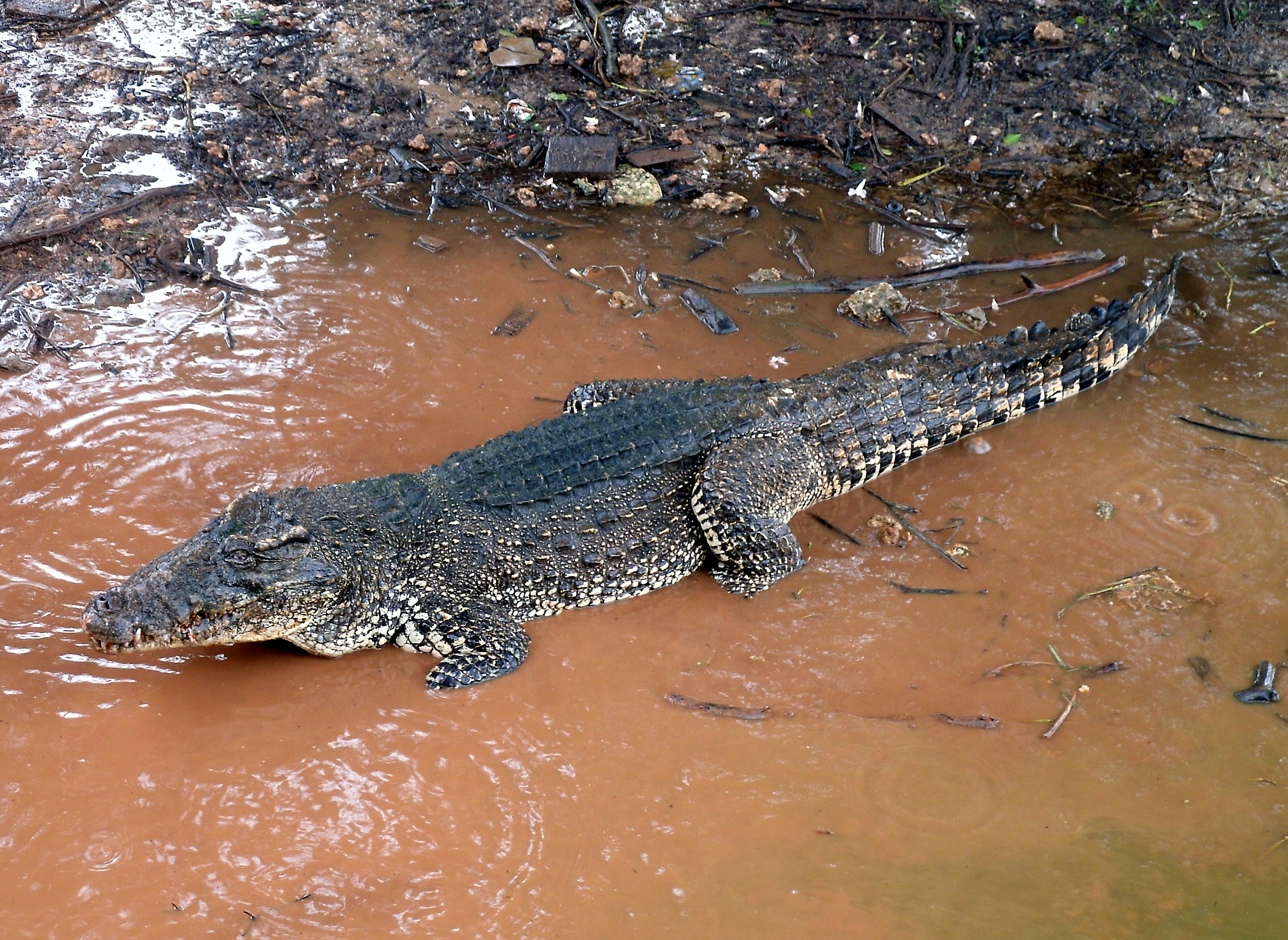
- At Zapata Swamp, Matanzas Province, Cuba

Conservation status
- Critically Endangered (IUCN 3.1)
- CITES Appendix I

Scientific classification
- Kingdom: Animalia
- Phylum: Chordata
- Class: Reptilia
- Order: Crocodilia
- Family: Crocodylidae
- Genus: Crocodylus
- Species: C. rhombifer

Binomial name
- Crocodylus rhombifer Cuvier, 1807
- Cuban crocodile range

Synonyms
- Crocodylus pristinus Leidy; Crocodylus antillensis Varona

= Cuban crocodile =

Cuban crocodile Temporal range: Pleistocene–present, 2.6–0 Ma

Species of crocodile endemic to Cuba

The Cuban crocodile (Crocodylus rhombifer) is a small-medium species of crocodile endemic to Cuba. Typical length is 2.1–2.3 m (6 ft 11 in – 7 ft 7 in) and typical weight 70–80 kg (150–180 lb). Large males can reach as much as 3.5 m (11 ft) in length and weigh more than 215 kg (474 lb).

The Cuban crocodile is of interest to biologists for its unique physical and behavioral traits. Long- and strong-legged, it is the most terrestrial of extant crocodiles. Its preferred habitat comprises freshwater and brackish water environments, such as mangrove swamps, coastal lagoons, estuaries, marshes, floodplains, and river deltas. There, the adults feed on fish, turtles and small mammals, while the young eat invertebrates and smaller fish. Mating occurs between May and July. Captive animals have displayed cooperative hunting behavior, and can be taught tricks, suggesting intelligence.

The Cuban crocodile is listed as critically endangered on the IUCN Red List. Once spread across the Caribbean, its range has dwindled to only the Zapata Swamp, due to hunting by humans. Captive breeding projects are in place to help the species recover. The species' fossil record reveals it had at one point a greater range, with fossil remains being found in the Bahamas, Hispaniola and the Cayman Islands.

== Taxonomy ==
The genus Crocodylus likely originated in Africa and radiated outwards towards Southeast Asia and the Americas, although an Australasian origin has also been considered. Phylogenetic evidence supports Crocodylus diverging from its closest recent relative (the extinct Voay of Madagascar) around 25 million years ago, near the Oligocene/Miocene boundary.

Below is a cladogram utilizing data from a 2018 tip dating study by Lee & Yates, simultaneously using morphological, molecular (DNA sequencing), and stratigraphic (fossil age) data, as revised by the 2021 Hekkala et al. paleogenomics study using DNA extracted from the extinct Voay. Hall's New Guinea crocodile placement suggested in 2023 study by Sales-Oliveira et al.

- Crocodylus
  - - - - - - Crocodylus johnstoni Freshwater crocodile
      - - - - Crocodylus novaeguineae New Guinea crocodile
          - - Crocodylus halli Hall's New Guinea crocodile
        - - - Crocodylus mindorensis Philippine crocodile
    - - - - - Crocodylus porosus Saltwater crocodile
      - - - - Crocodylus siamensis Siamese crocodile
        - - - Crocodylus palustris Mugger crocodile
  - - - - - - Crocodylus suchus West African crocodile
    - - - - - Crocodylus niloticus Nile crocodile
      - - - - Crocodylus rhombifer Cuban crocodile
        - - - Crocodylus intermedius Orinoco crocodile
            - Crocodylus acutus American crocodile
          - - Crocodylus moreletii Morelet's crocodile

== Characteristics ==
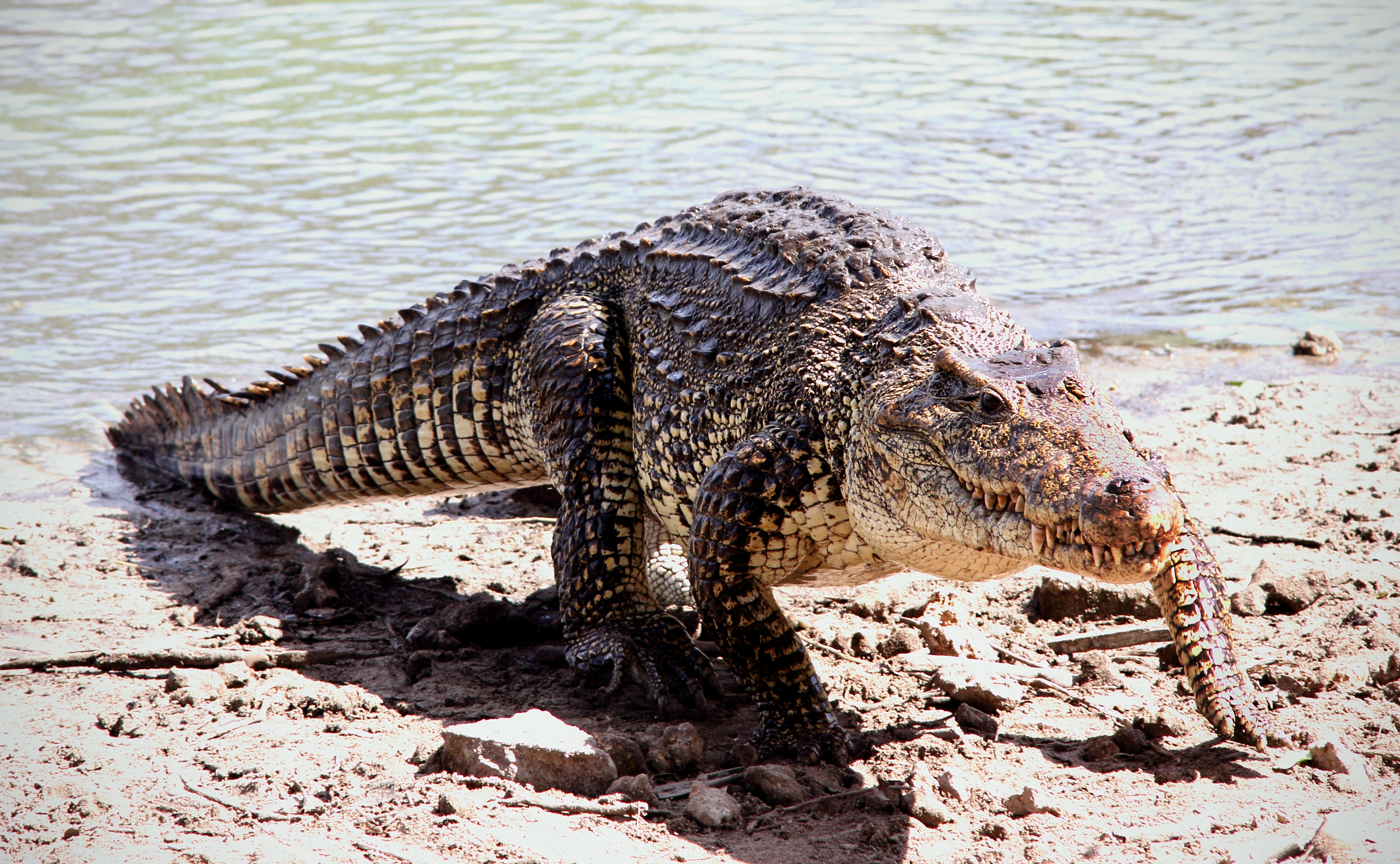
Cuban crocodile

The Cuban crocodile has numerous characteristics that set it apart from other crocodilians, such as its brighter adult colors, rougher, more 'pebbled' scales, and long, strong legs. The species is the most heavily armored extant member of its genus. This is a small to mid-sized crocodilian. Typical adults were found to have measured 2.1–2.73 m (6 ft 11 in – 8 ft 11 in) in length and weighed 70–120 kg (150–260 lb). Large males can reach as much as 3.5 m (11 ft) in length and weigh 215 kg (474 lb) or more. Three individuals measuring 1.87–2.46 m (6 ft 2 in – 8 ft 1 in) and weighing 30–65 kg (66–143 lb) had a bite force of 1,392–3,127 N (313–703 lb_{f}).

== Distribution and habitat ==
Today, the Cuban crocodile can only be found in Cuba's Zapata Swamp, where it is highly endangered. It formerly ranged elsewhere in the Caribbean; fossils of this species have been found in the Cayman Islands, The Bahamas and Hispaniola (the Dominican Republic).

The Cuban crocodile appears to favor freshwater habitat such as swamps, marshes, and rivers and rarely swims in saltwater.

== Behavior and ecology ==
The Cuban crocodile has been observed to display peculiar behavior not observed in other crocodilians, and is also considered to be the most morphologically and behaviorally distinct of any of the Crocodylus species. A colony of this species has exhibited what is strongly suspected to be pack-hunting behavior, which may explain the predation of prehistoric megafauna that coexisted with this species, such as giant Caribbean sloths and giant West Indian tortoises. It is also the most terrestrial crocodile, with reduced webbing between digits on the hind feet and no webbing on the front feet. It exhibits highly intelligent behavior unusual for crocodilians.

=== Hunting and diet ===
Small fish, arthropods, and crustaceans make up the diet of young Cuban crocodiles. Adults of the species feed mostly upon small mammals, fish, and turtles. They have blunt rear teeth, which aid in crushing the shells of their turtle prey. Cuban crocodiles also demonstrate the jumping feeding technique seen in other crocodilians, such as the American alligator. By thrusting with their powerful tails, they can leap from the water and snatch small arboreal animals from overhanging branches. They can also run anywhere between 15 and 22 mph (24 and 35 km/h), using a gait similar to a gallop, which allows for more quick and aggressive movements. The Cuban crocodile, while not a particularly large species, is often regarded as the most aggressive New World crocodile. It is behaviorally dominant over the larger American crocodile in areas where the two species coexist. Data regarding attacks on humans are limited, but occurrences are likely rare given the species' very small distribution area and separation from human populations. Despite its reported aggression, there is only a single known fatal human attack by this species: an elderly man who was attacked and killed in 1995 while spearfishing in the Zapata Swamp.

== Reproduction ==
The mating season of the Cuban crocodile is between the months of May and July. This is thought to be related to environmental changes, such as rainfall and temperature. In the wild, crocodiles will nest in wet marshes; where they will create trenches and cover the eggs with organic material. In captivity, crocodiles will create mounds. During the nesting period, the Cuban crocodiles will lay between 30 and 40 eggs and the estimated incubation period is 58–70 days. Hatching can occur from late August to early September. Due to the predation of humans, raccoons, and other animals, many eggs will not hatch. At birth, hatchlings are approximately 2–3 inches (51–76 mm) in length, and weigh 0.25 pounds (0.11 kg). As with other crocodilians the sex of the Cuban crocodile's offspring is determined by the temperature in the nest. In conservation, the eggs are kept in incubators that provide a constant environment of 32 degrees Celsius in order to produce males. Cuban crocodiles are an aggressive species and are known to have performed acts of cannibalism. This is a contributing cause for the majority of offspring not surviving to the juvenile stage. In 2012, two Cuban crocodile hatchlings were born in conservation at the National Zoo in Washington, D.C. This was the first time in 25 years that the Cuban crocodile had been successfully bred at this zoo. The species is known to hybridize with American crocodiles, which may represent a risk for conservation of the species.

== Conservation ==
The Cuban crocodile is a critically endangered species, listed on CITES appendix 1. Its restricted habitat and range make it very vulnerable. Humans have hunted this species to near extinction. Much research remains to be done on the remaining wild populations. The species is represented in captivity in Europe, the United States, and in at least one zoo in India, where breeding projects are taking place.

Hybridization with the American crocodile also represents a significant threat to the Cuban crocodile. The loss of the unique genetic and behavioral characteristics of this species is increasingly significant. Genetic analysis has found that a high percentage of wild Cuban crocodiles (49.1%) and captive Cuban crocodiles (16.1%) are hybrids with the more abundant American crocodile.

Two famous Cuban crocodiles reside in the Skansen Aquarium in Sweden. The crocodiles, named Castro and Hillary, were previously owned by the Cuban leader Fidel Castro, before they were given to the cosmonaut Vladimir Shatalov in 1978. When Shatalov could no longer take care of the crocodiles, they were given to the Moscow Zoo, which in turn gifted them to the Skansen aquarium in 1981. The crocodile couple has produced numerous young since 1984. One of the crocodiles was involved in an attack on a human in 2019 who held his arm over the enclosure during a crayfish party. The man survived but his arm was critically injured and had to be amputated.

The largest Cuban crocodile breeding farm in the world is Zapata Swamp Crocodile Breeding Farm. It was suggested that 145 four-month-old crocodiles bred at the farm were killed by feral cats in 2022, following an investigation by two biologists who manage the farm.
