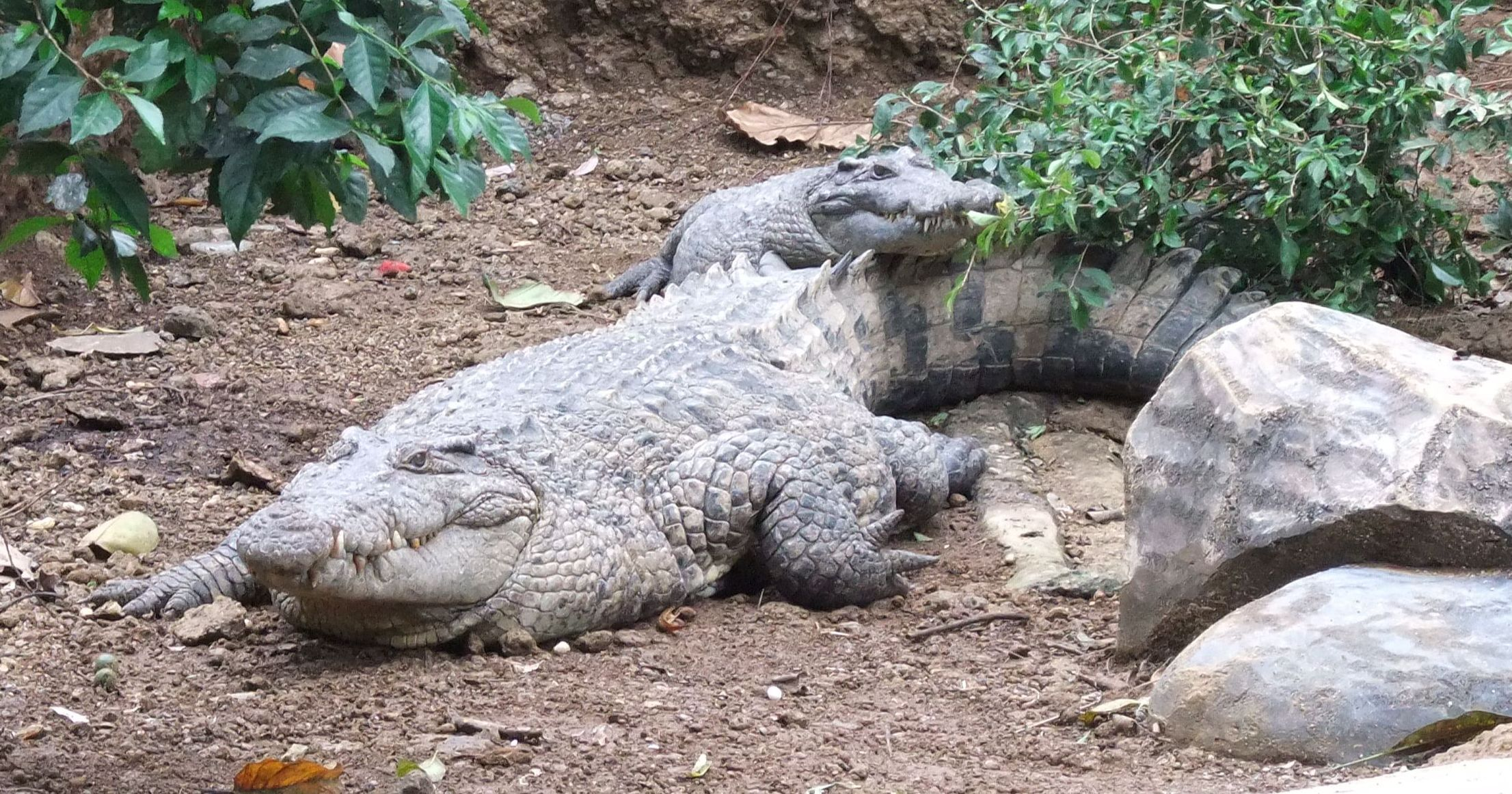
- New Guinea crocodile at Bandung Zoo in West Java, Indonesia

Conservation status
- Least Concern (IUCN 3.1)
- CITES Appendix II

Scientific classification
- Kingdom: Animalia
- Phylum: Chordata
- Class: Reptilia
- Order: Crocodylia
- Family: Crocodylidae
- Genus: Crocodylus
- Species: C. novaeguineae

Binomial name
- Crocodylus novaeguineae (Schmidt, 1928)
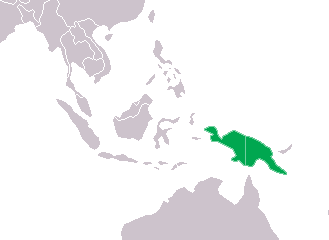
- Range shown in green (including Hall's New Guinea crocodile)

Synonyms
- C. n. novaeguineae

= New Guinea crocodile =

New Guinea crocodile Temporal range: Late Pleistocene–Present, 0.1–0 Ma

Species of reptile

The New Guinea crocodile (Crocodylus novaeguineae) is a small species of crocodile found on the island of New Guinea north of the mountain ridge that runs along the centre of the island. The population found south of the mountain ridge, formerly considered a genetically distinct population, is now considered a distinct species, Hall's New Guinea crocodile (C. halli). In the past it included the Philippine crocodile, C. n. mindorensis, as a subspecies, but today they are regarded as separate species. The habitat of the New Guinea crocodile is mostly freshwater swamps and lakes. It is most active at night when it feeds on fish and a range of other small animals. A female crocodile lays a clutch of eggs in a nest composed of vegetation and she lies up nearby to guard the nest. There is some degree of parental care for newly hatched juveniles. This crocodile was over-hunted for its valuable skin in the mid 20th century, but conservation measures have since been put in place, it is reared in ranches and the International Union for Conservation of Nature (IUCN) lists it as being of "Least Concern".

== Taxonomy and etymology ==
The New Guinea crocodile was first described by the American herpetologist Karl Patterson Schmidt in 1928 as Crocodylus novaeguineae. At one time it was thought that there were two subspecies, C. n. novaeguineae, the New Guinea crocodile native to Papua New Guinea and Western New Guinea, and C. n. mindorensis, the Philippine crocodile, native to several islands including Busuanga, Luzon, Masbate, Mindoro, Negros, Samar and Mindanao. Most authorities now consider that the Philippine crocodile is an entirely separate species. DNA sequencing data reported in 2011 showed that the Philippine crocodile is, in part, paraphyletic with regard to the New Guinea crocodile, and that the latter may constitutes a population within the Philippine crocodile. Among their two samples for the New Guinea crocodile, one was part of the Philippine crocodile clade and the other was separate, estimated to have diverged 2.6–6.8 million years ago. Both samples were taken from captives (could potentially be misidentified or hybrids) and the result should therefore be treated with caution.

The genus name Crocodylus comes from the Greek kroko which means a pebble and deilos, a worm or man, referring to the knobbly appearance of the dorsal surface of the reptile. The specific epithet novaeguineae is from the Latin and means "of New Guinea". Other common names for this crocodile include New Guinea freshwater crocodile, Singapore large grain, Puk Puk, Buaya air tawar and Wahne huala.

Crocodylus halli, also known as Hall's New Guinea crocodile, is the closest relative of the New Guinea Crocodile. It is also endemic to the island of New Guinea, where it inhabits the lower part of the island, located south of the New Guinea highlands. Crocodylus halli was declared a separate species in 2019, and was named after Philip M. Hall, a researcher at the University of Florida who performed the initial studies to clarify the species' distinctiveness. Both species look very much alike, however they differ both genetically and regarding the bone structure of their skulls.

=== Phylogeny ===
The genus Crocodylus likely originated in Africa and radiated outwards towards Southeast Asia and the Americas, although an Australia/Asia origin has also been considered. Phylogenetic evidence supports Crocodylus diverging from its closest recent relative, the extinct Voay of Madagascar, around 25 million years ago, near the Oligocene/Miocene boundary.

Below is a cladogram based on a 2018 tip dating study by Lee & Yates simultaneously using morphological, molecular (DNA sequencing), and stratigraphic (fossil age) data, as revised by the 2021 Hekkala et al. paleogenomics study using DNA extracted from the extinct Voay. Hall's New Guinea crocodile placement suggested in 2023 study by Sales-Oliveira et al.

- Crocodylus
  - - - - - - Crocodylus johnstoni Freshwater crocodile
      - - - - Crocodylus novaeguineae New Guinea crocodile
          - - Crocodylus halli Hall's New Guinea crocodile
        - - - Crocodylus mindorensis Philippine crocodile
    - - - - - Crocodylus porosus Saltwater crocodile
      - - - - Crocodylus siamensis Siamese crocodile
        - - - Crocodylus palustris Mugger crocodile
  - - - - - - Crocodylus suchus West African crocodile
    - - - - - Crocodylus niloticus Nile crocodile
      - - - - Crocodylus rhombifer Cuban crocodile
        - - - Crocodylus intermedius Orinoco crocodile
            - Crocodylus acutus American crocodile
          - - Crocodylus moreletii Morelet's crocodile

== Description ==
The New Guinea crocodile grows to a length of up to 3.5 m (11 ft) for males and 2.7 m (8.9 ft) for females, and can weigh up to 200 kg (440 lb), although most specimens are smaller. In a study, two crocodiles measuring 2.91 to 3.15 m (9 ft 7 in – 10 ft 4 in) and weighing 123–186 kg (271–410 lb) had a bite force in the range of 4,782–5,938 N (1,075–1,335 lb_{f}). The body ranges from grey to brown in colour, with darker bandings on the tail and body which become less noticeable as the animal grows. Longitudinal ridges in front of the eyes and some granular scales on the back of the neck between four large scales are distinctive features of this species. There are some differences between the northerly and southerly populations in the morphology of the skull and the arrangement of the scales. The snout is pointed and relatively narrow during juvenile stages and becomes wider as the animal matures. The New Guinea crocodile bears a physical similarity to the nearby Philippine crocodile (C. mindorensis) and Siamese crocodile (C. siamensis). The colouring is similar to that of the freshwater crocodile (Crocodylus johnsoni) of northern Australia, but the snout is somewhat shorter and broader.

== Distribution and habitat ==
This crocodile is to be found in the freshwater swamps, marshes and lakes of northern New Guinea, particularly in the interior. It has been known to enter brackish waters but is very rare in coastal areas, and never found in the presence of the competing saltwater crocodile (C. porosus). The animal was first described from the area of the Sepik River in the north of Papua New Guinea. The closely related Hall's New Guinea crocodile is found in the southern half of the island, with a range that extends from southeastern Papua New Guinea to the Indonesian provinces of South Papua. It is separated from the New Guinea crocodile by the New Guinea Highlands, a mountain range that runs along the centre of the island. DNA analysis has revealed these to be genetically distinct species, and there are some differences in their morphology and behavior. There are estimated to be between 50,000 and 100,000 New Guinea and Hall's New Guinea crocodiles in the wild.

== Behaviour ==
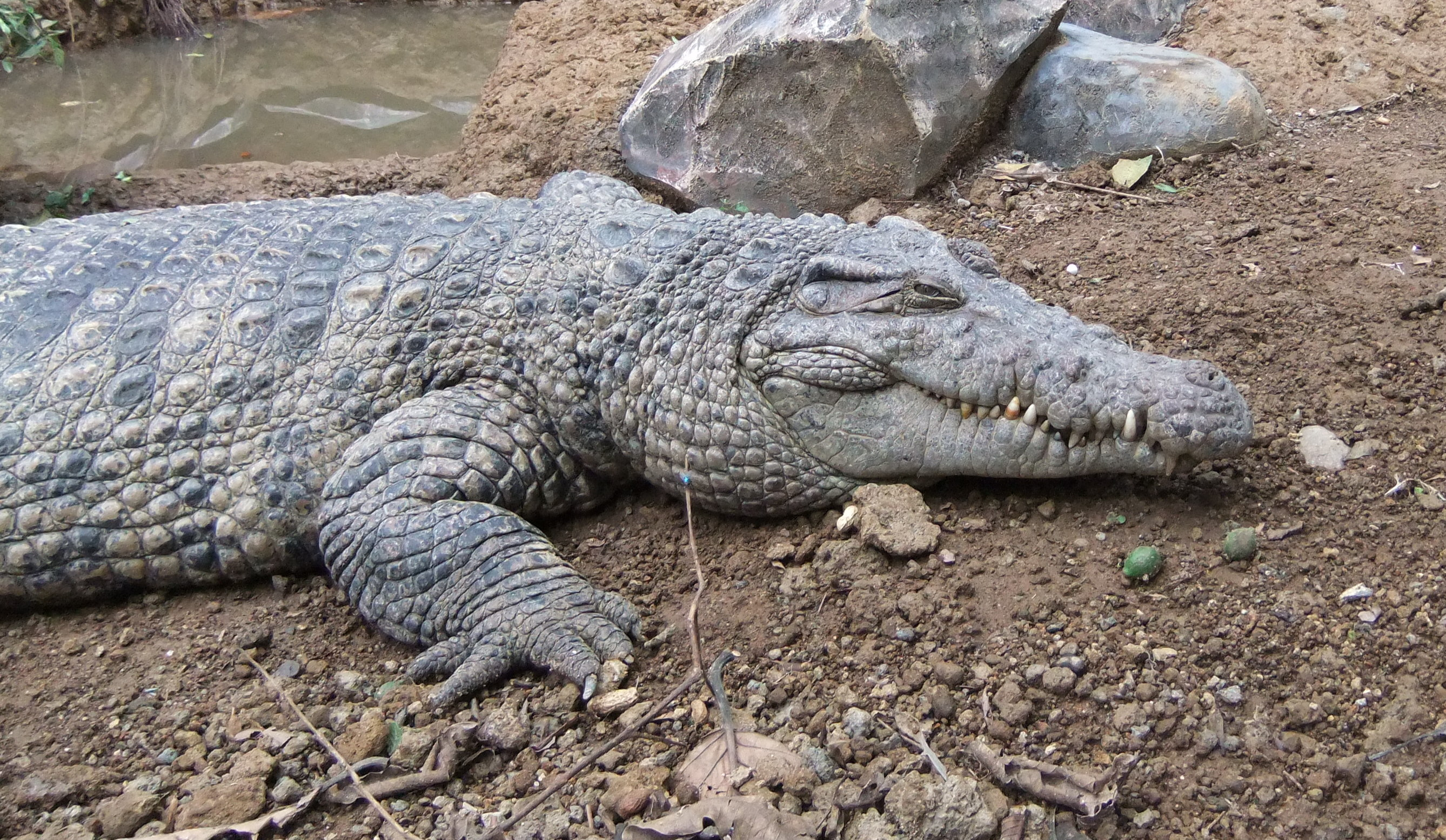
At Bandung Zoo, West Java, Indonesia

New Guinea crocodiles have a mostly aquatic lifestyle and are largely nocturnal. They spend much of the day underwater, often with their nostrils and eyes above the surface. Powerful side-to-side movements of their tails propel them through the water and they use both tail and legs to steer. When on land, they favour shady, dense areas of undergrowth. They tend to bask in a group during the day, dispersing at night to feed.

Females become sexually mature when about 1.6 to 2 metres (5 ft 3 in to 6 ft 7 in) long and males at about 2.5 metres (8 ft 2 in). Eggs are laid about 14 days after mating. In the northern population, breeding takes place during the dry season between August and October. A floating nest composed of vegetation is made in a shallow water location such as in an overgrown channel, at the edge of a lake, on a scroll swale or beside a stream. A clutch of between 22 and 45 eggs is laid and covered with further vegetation. In the southern population, the wet season is chosen for reproduction. The nest is sometimes built in similar locations to the northern nests, but is more often on land, and a smaller number of rather larger eggs is laid. In both populations, the mother stays near the nest during the incubation period, which lasts about 80 days. When the eggs start to hatch, the emerging young are quite vocal, and both male and female crocodiles have been observed transporting hatching and newly hatched young to open water, carrying them delicately in their mouths.

Newly hatched New Guinea crocodiles feed on aquatic insects, spiders, tadpoles, freshwater snails, frogs, fish and small mammals. As they grow, so does the size of their prey and their consumption of fish rises, but they still will eat anything of a worthwhile size that they can find. An adult's diet is largely fish, caught by sweeping the snout sideways and snapping at the prey, but also includes shrimps, crabs, frogs, snakes, birds and medium-sized mammals. A crocodile catches its prey by stealth with a flick of its head, impaling it with its sharp teeth and gripping and crushing it. The jaws cannot move sideways to chew the food; instead, the crocodile's head is tossed to move the prey to the back of the mouth before the prey is swallowed whole. This crocodile is surprisingly agile and can lunge its body upward into the air to catch bats, flying birds, and leaping fish. It can also probe into the mud at the bottom of a river or swamp with its snout to search for crabs and mollusks.

Adult and young New Guinea crocodiles have a range of vocalisations. An adult female can produce a repeated throaty "roar" when approached by another adult. The young start communicating with each other while still in the egg; this may help synchronise hatching. Newly hatched juveniles use various yelps and grunts. When startled, a warning sound emitted by one will send all the juveniles diving to the bottom of the water. Adults in the vicinity respond with growls, threats, and attacks. The distress noises of a youngster when handled at a ranching facility was observed to cause all the larger animals to become involved in frenzied activity, with some rushing towards the juvenile and others thrashing about in the water and slapping their heads down on the surface.

== Status and conservation ==
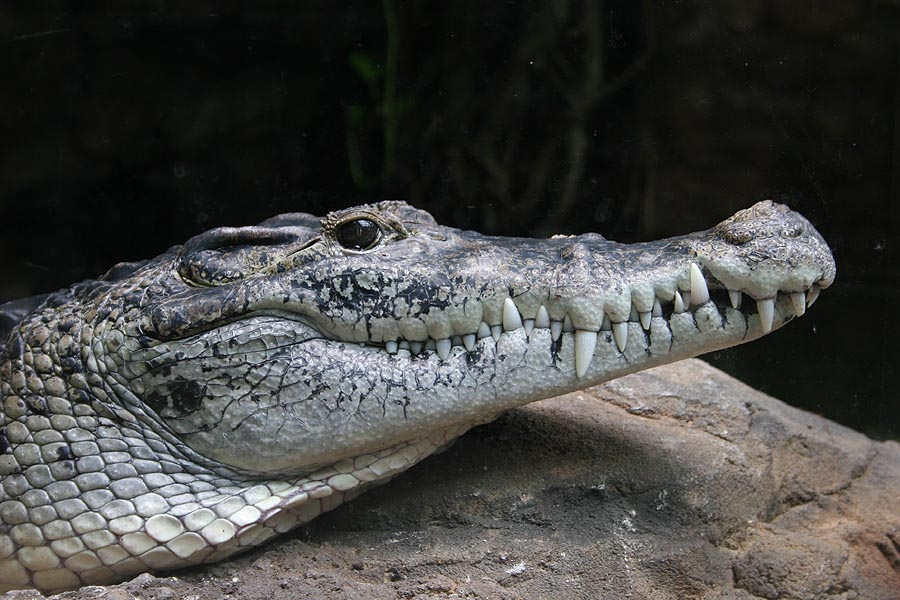
At Wuppertal Zoo

The IUCN listed this crocodile as being "Vulnerable" in its Red List of Threatened Species in 1986 and 1988, but changed the assessment to "Least Concern" in 1996. At the time it was stated that the animal has a large area of suitable habitat and seemed to be plentiful. Its status has not been reassessed since then. It is included in Appendix II of the Convention on International Trade in Endangered Species of Wild Fauna and Flora (CITES).

The skin of the New Guinea crocodile is valuable and in the 1950s and 1960s the animals in the northern population were heavily hunted to a point where they might have become extinct. Around 1970, legislation was put in place and they received some protection. In the period 1977 to 1980, the harvest of wild skins was over 20,000 per year but in the 1980s this declined to 12,000 to 20,000. As well as this, some 2,500 to 10,000 eggs and hatchlings were collected annually to raise on ranches. However, in 1995, the largest ranch on the island initiated a change of strategy to concentrate on raising the saltwater crocodile, and demand for the eggs and juveniles of the New Guinea crocodile dried up. Since then, cropping of wild animals has been controlled in both Indonesia and Papua New Guinea. In the former it is limited to a belly width of 25 to 51 cm (10 to 20 in) for wet skins and in the latter to salted skins with a belly width of 18 to 51 cm (7 to 20 in). Some eggs and hatchlings are still removed from the nest and raised in enclosures and a similar programme has more recently been initiated for southern populations.

=== 2018 killing of New Guinea crocodiles ===
In July 2018, a man was reportedly killed by a saltwater crocodile in a breeding farm in West Papua, Indonesia. Locals then killed 292 saltwater and New Guinea crocodiles at the farm in revenge.

== See also ==
- Wildlife of Indonesia
