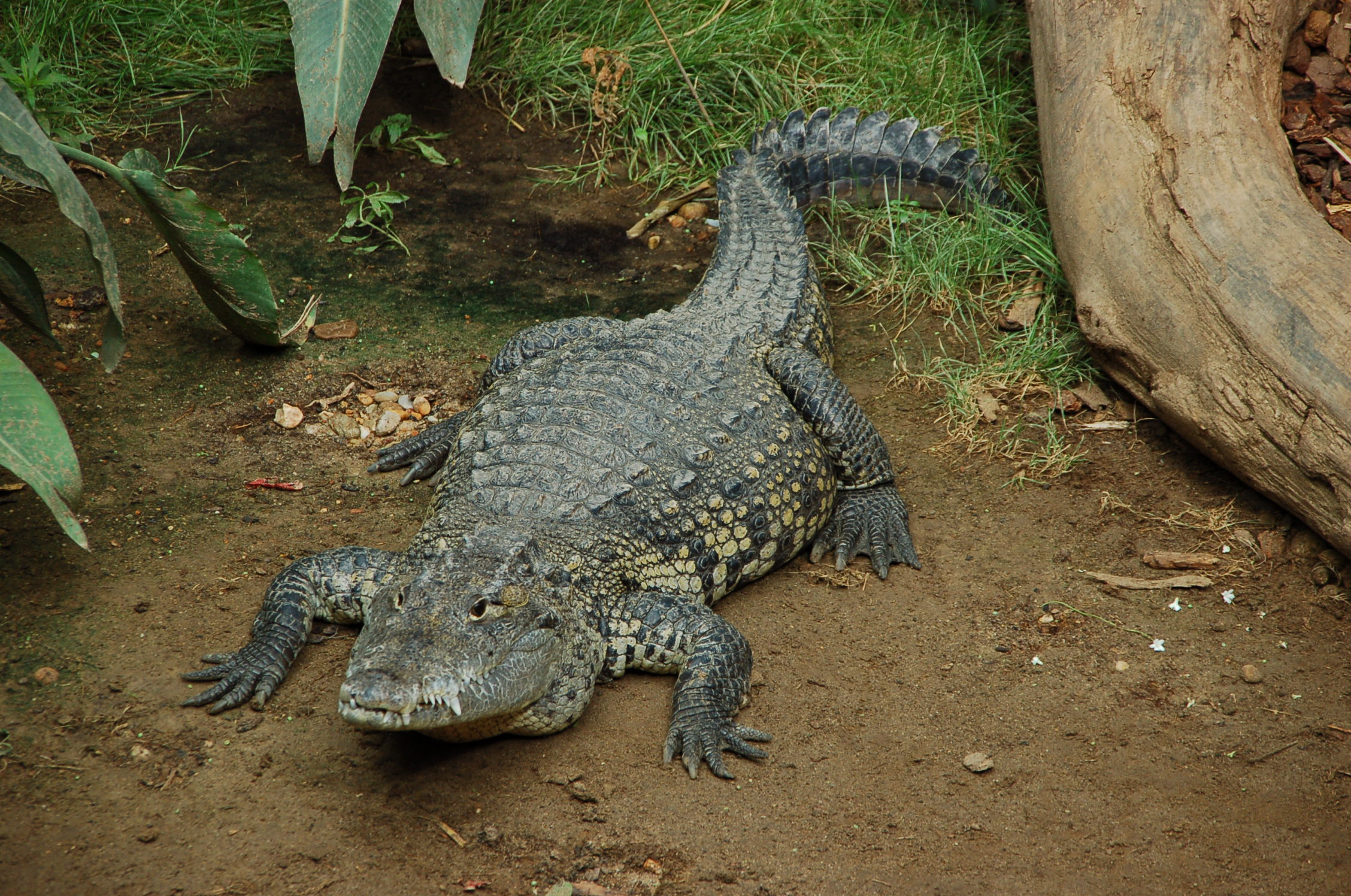

Conservation status
- Least Concern (IUCN 3.1)
- CITES Appendix I (Note: Except populations of Belize and Mexico which are included in Appendix II.)

Scientific classification
- Kingdom: Animalia
- Phylum: Chordata
- Class: Reptilia
- Order: Crocodylia
- Family: Crocodylidae
- Genus: Crocodylus
- Species: C. moreletii

Binomial name
- Crocodylus moreletii (A.H.A. Duméril & Bibron, 1851)
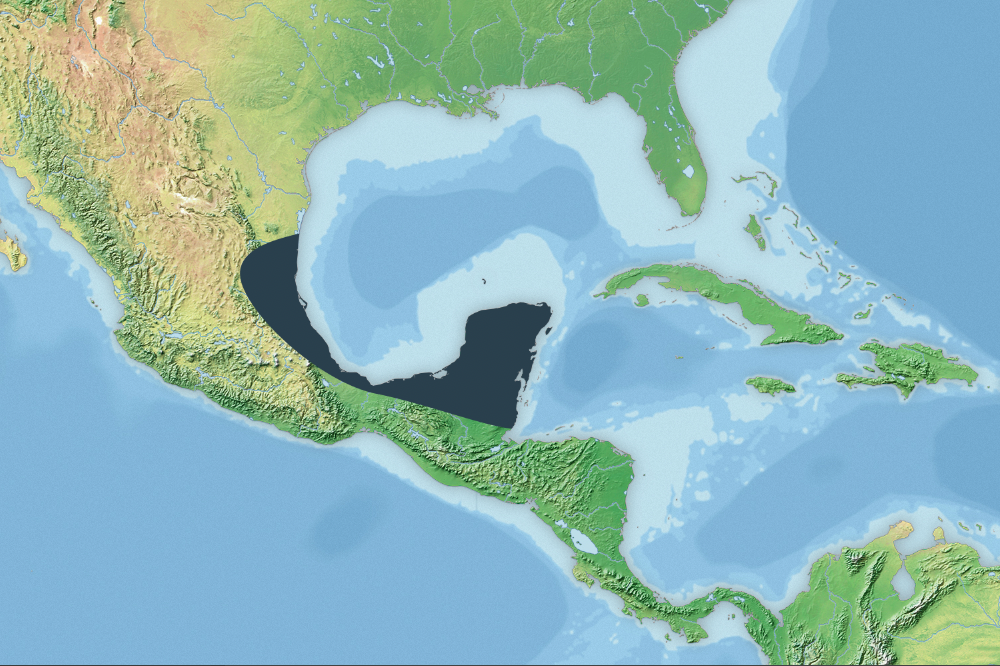
- Range of Crocodylus moreletii

Synonyms
- Crocodilus moreletii A.H.A. Duméril & Bibron, 1851; Crocodilus americanus var. moreletii A.H.A. Duméril & Bibron, 1851; Alligator lacordairei Preudhomme de Borre, 1869; Crocodylus mexicanus Bocourt, 1869

= Morelet's crocodile =

Morelet's crocodile Temporal range: Late Pleistocene–Present, 0.1–0 Ma

Species of reptile

Morelet's crocodile (Crocodylus moreletii), also known commonly as the Mexican crocodile, the Belize crocodile, and el cocodrilo de pantano in Spanish, is a modest-sized crocodilian in the family Crocodylidae. The species is found only in the Atlantic regions of Mexico, Belize and Guatemala. It usually grows to about 3 metres (10 ft) in total length (tail included). It is a species at least concern for extinction according to the International Union for Conservation of Nature. The species has a fossil record in Guatemala.

== Taxonomy and etymology ==
Morelet's crocodile was first discovered in 1850 in Mexico by the French naturalist Pierre Marie Arthur Morelet. The species was subsequently named after him in 1851 by French herpetologists Auguste Duméril and Gabriel Bibron. It was long confused with the American and Cuban crocodiles because of similar characteristics and an ambiguous type locality. It was not generally accepted as a separate species until the 1920s.

=== Evolution ===
The genus Crocodylus likely originated in Africa and radiated outwards towards Southeast Asia and the Americas, although an Australia/Asia origin has also been considered. Phylogenetic evidence supports Crocodylus diverging from its closest recent relative, the extinct Voay of Madagascar, around 25 million years ago, near the Oligocene/Miocene boundary.

=== Phylogeny ===
Below is a cladogram based on a 2018 tip dating study by Lee & Yates simultaneously using morphological, molecular (DNA sequencing), and stratigraphic (fossil age) data, as revised by the 2021 Hekkala et al. paleogenomics study using DNA extracted from the extinct Voay. Hall's New Guinea crocodile placement suggested in 2023 study by Sales-Oliveira et al.

- Crocodylus
  - - - - - - Crocodylus johnstoni Freshwater crocodile
      - - - - Crocodylus novaeguineae New Guinea crocodile
          - - Crocodylus halli Hall's New Guinea crocodile
        - - - Crocodylus mindorensis Philippine crocodile
    - - - - - Crocodylus porosus Saltwater crocodile
      - - - - Crocodylus siamensis Siamese crocodile
        - - - Crocodylus palustris Mugger crocodile
  - - - - - - Crocodylus suchus West African crocodile
    - - - - - Crocodylus niloticus Nile crocodile
      - - - - Crocodylus rhombifer Cuban crocodile
        - - - Crocodylus intermedius Orinoco crocodile
            - Crocodylus acutus American crocodile
          - - Crocodylus moreletii Morelet's crocodile

== Distribution and habitat ==
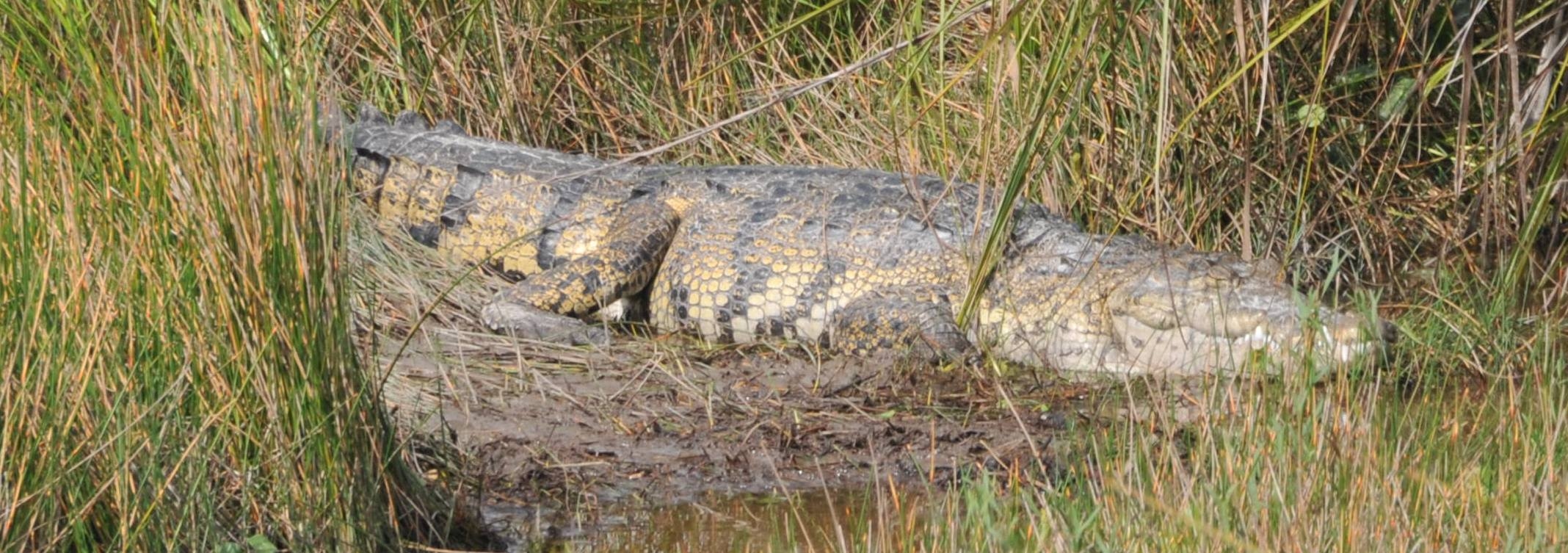
at Lago Cobá, Quintana Roo, Mexico

Morelet's crocodile can be found in freshwater habitats in Central America and along the Gulf of Mexico stretching through Belize, Guatemala, and Mexico. The Belizean pine forests are an example of the type of ecoregion in which it occurs.

In its freshwater habitats, it prefers isolated areas that are secluded. This species of crocodile can mainly be found in freshwater swamps and marshes which are located inland, and in large rivers and lakes. Both of these habitats are forested to help add cover.

Morelet's crocodile can also be found along the coast in brackish waters and the grassy savannas on the Yucatán Peninsula. It becomes much more distributed during the rainy seasons when flooding occurs and it is easier for it to move elsewhere.

Juvenile Morelet's crocodiles live in very dense cover to protect themselves from other predators that might be in the area, and will remain there until they become older and able to fend for themselves. Adult crocodiles are known to dig out burrows during dry seasons in their area. The range of Morelet's crocodile can overlap with that of the American crocodile, which can sometimes lead to them being confused with one another. Morelet's crocodile generally prefers mainland freshwater habitats, while the American crocodile in the shared range is typically found in areas of saline mangrove, often on cays or atolls.

Reports dating back to 2012 indicate that Morelet's crocodile has recently been introduced into the Rio Grande (called Río Bravo in Mexico). Several newspaper outlets on the Mexican side of the border report of reptiles inhabiting the river appearing not to be the American alligator which is native to Texas, but the Morelet's crocodile which is native to Tamaulipas from San Fernando southward. In Tamaulipas, crocodiles have been seen in the cities of Matamoros, Reynosa and as far north as Nuevo Laredo. The sightings have prompted several municipal police departments to put up signs warning people about entering the river.

== Description ==
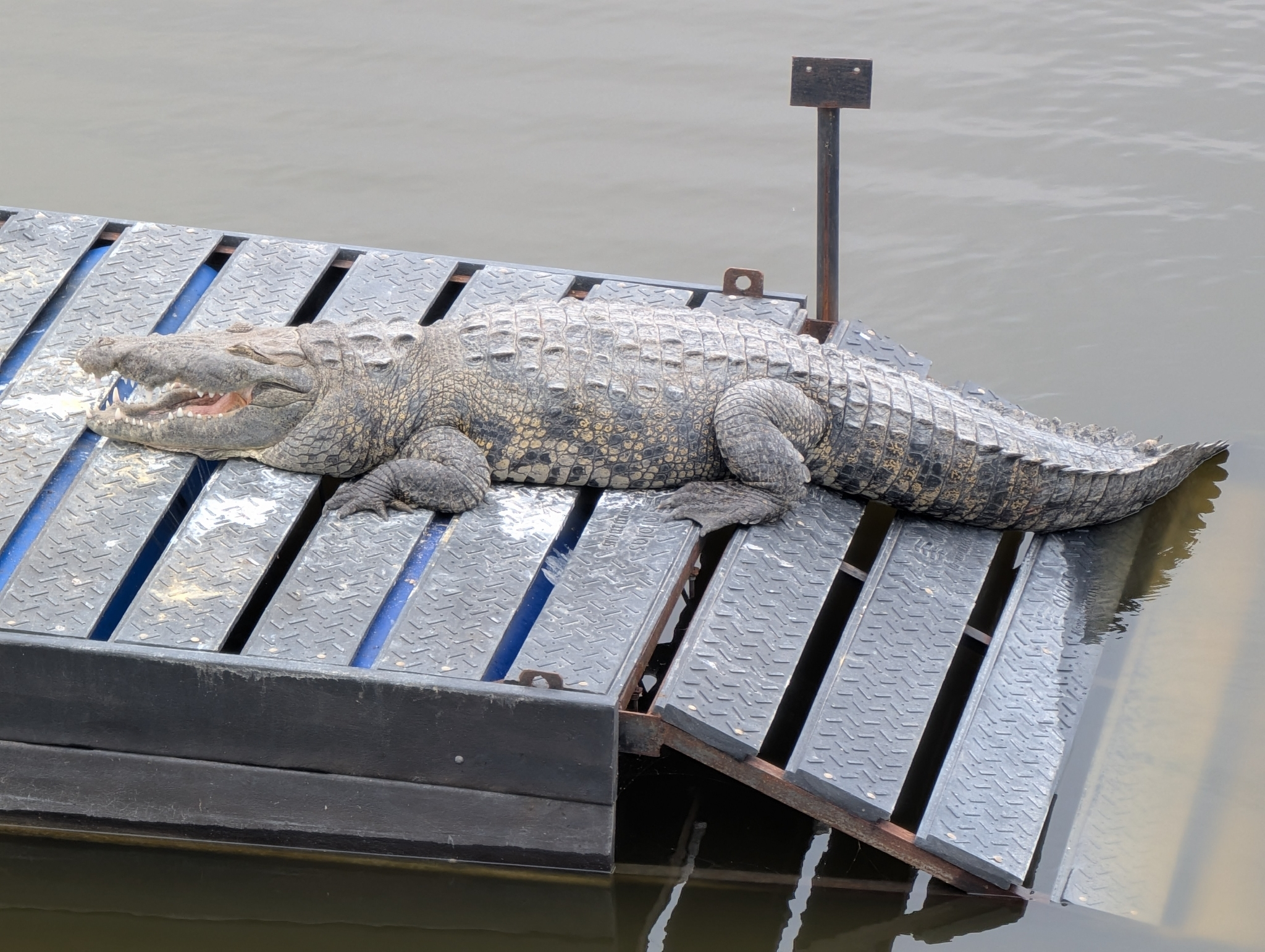
In Tamaulipas (Mexico)

Morelet's crocodile (Crocodylus moreletii) is similar in appearance and morphology to the Cuban crocodile (Crocodylus rhombifer) and the larger American crocodile (Crocodylus acutus). When fully mature, Morelet's crocodile has a broad snout with 66–68 teeth. It is grayish-brown in color with dark bands and spots on the body and tail. This is similar to other crocodiles, like the American crocodile, but Morelet's crocodile is somewhat darker. Juvenile Morelet's crocodiles are bright yellow with dark bands. The iris is silvery brown. It has four short legs, giving it a rather sprawling gait, and a long tail, which is used for swimming. The hind feet are webbed. Despite its short legs, it is a fast runner.

=== Size ===
Morelet's crocodile is smaller than most other crocodiles, though it is larger than the dwarf crocodile (Osteolaemus tetraspis). Adult males are typically larger than females. The average adult Morelet's crocodile is about 2.1 m (6 ft 11 in) in total length (tail included), with a typical length range of 1.5 to 2.7 m (4 ft 11 in to 8 ft 10 in) (the lower measurement representing the mean total length of a female at sexual maturity which is attained at roughly 7–8 years of age in the wild).

Almost all Morelet's crocodiles in excess of 2.5 m (8 ft 2 in) are males, and at this advanced stage of maturity, the male goes through a significant change in skull morphology as the skull appears to increase in broadness and robustness. Large adult males can attain a length of 3 m (10 ft), anything in excess of this is considered exceptionally rare for this species, however the species has a maximum reported length of 4.5 m (15 ft), with two other outsized specimens reportedly measuring 4.1 and 4.3 m (13 and 14 ft), respectively. One mature adult specimen measuring 2.84 m (9 ft 4 in) and weighing 110 kg (240 lb) had a bite force of 4,399 N (989 lb_{f}). The weight of a large 3 m (10 ft) wild male crocodile is estimated to average around 150 kg (330 3/4 lb), although mass is likely much more in outsized individuals. One large male with a presumed total length of around 3.5 m (11 ft 6 in) weighed about 250 kg (550 lb). Another large individual measuring 3.3 m (10 ft 10 in) in length weighed 180 kg (400 lb).

== Biology and behavior ==
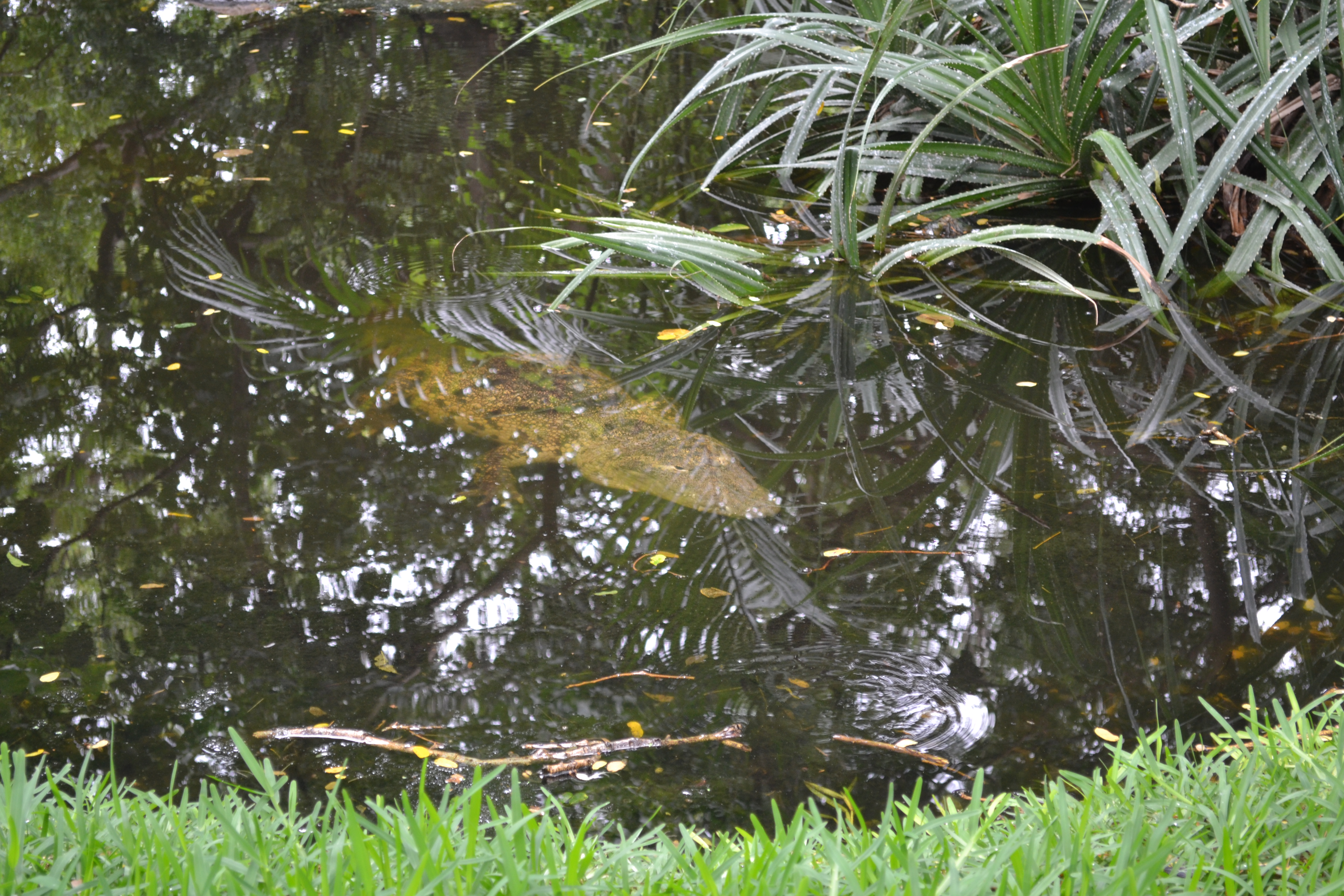
Morelet's crocodile waiting for an ambush

The only natural predator of Morelet's crocodile is the jaguar (Panthera onca). Predation of a Morelet's crocodile by a jaguar was captured for the first time on a camera trap in the Calakmul Biosphere Reserve of Yucatán, Mexico in 2019.

=== Hunting and diet ===
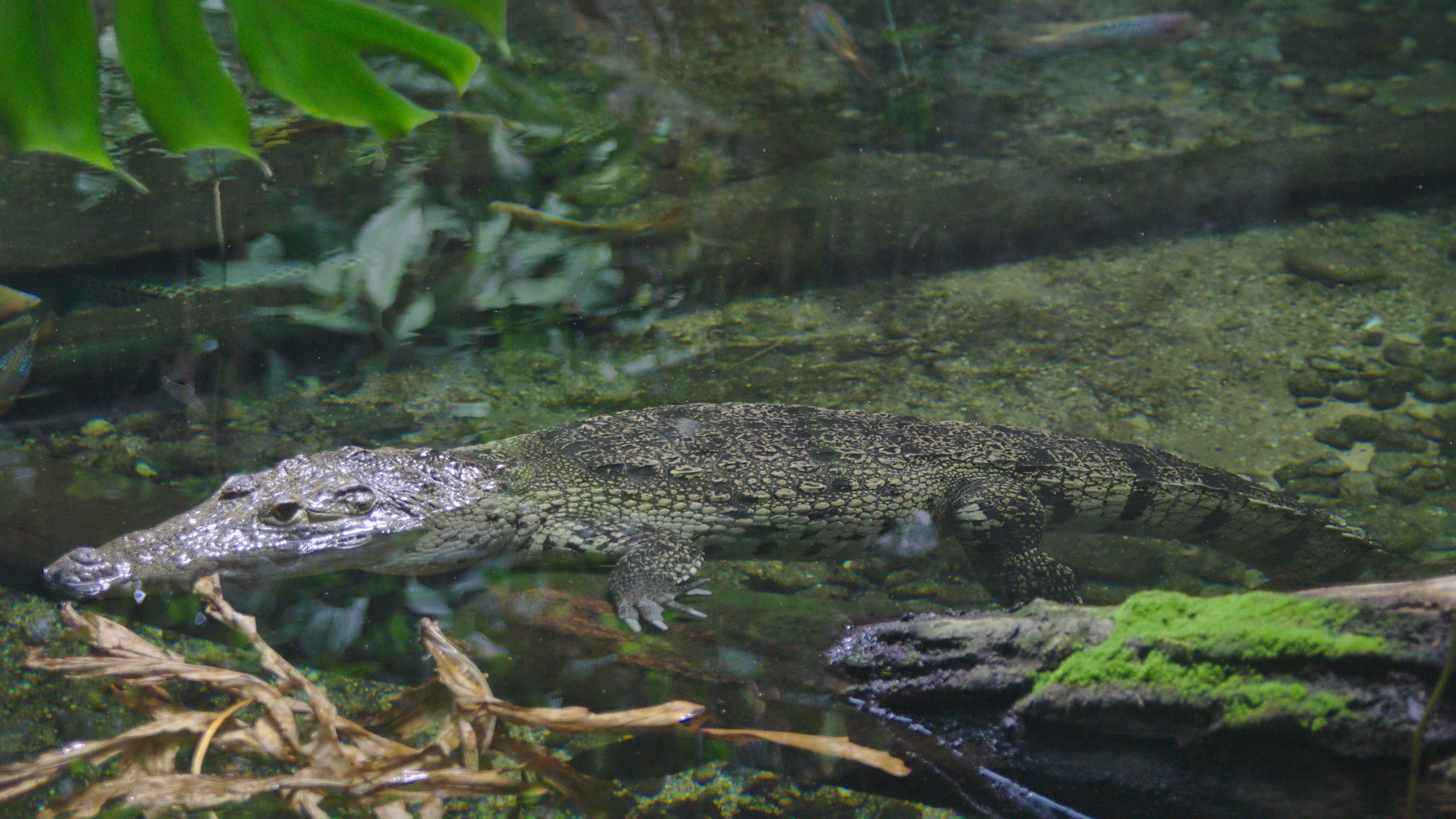
Morelet's crocodile swimming

Like most crocodilians, Morelet's crocodile is highly opportunistic and will prey on practically anything that it can overpower that comes into its territories. Juvenile Morelet's crocodiles feed largely on fish and insects until they become bigger and more capable of bringing down larger prey. Adults largely prey on small mammals, birds, other reptiles and fish, as well as gastropods, crustaceans and other invertebrates. Dogs and goats have been taken by this species, including a record of a 2.9 m (9 ft 6 in) adult killing an English sheepdog which weighed at least 35 kg (77 lb). Adults have also been recorded eating even larger animals, including cattle and tapirs, although these have been cases of scavenging on carcasses, with the tapir having been killed by a jaguar. Morelet's crocodile has been known to be cannibalistic towards smaller specimens. The species has attacked humans on multiple occasions and at least 12 documented human fatalities have occurred. Despite the relatively small size of the species, large adult Morelet's crocodiles are capable of overpowering a human. Due to partial consumption, recorded fatal attacks are likely predatory rather than defensive in nature.

=== Reproduction ===
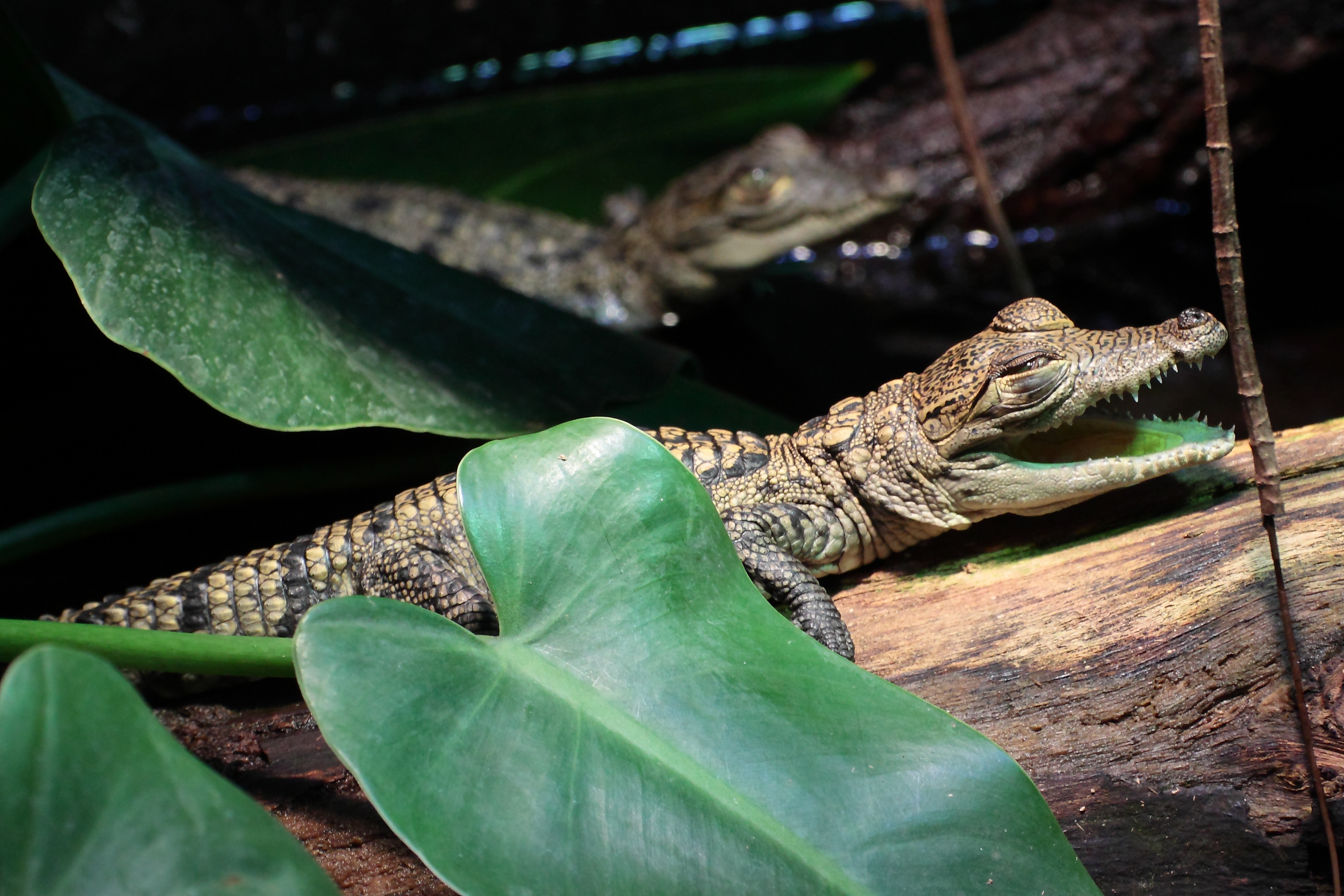
Six-month-old, at Tiergarten Schönbrunn

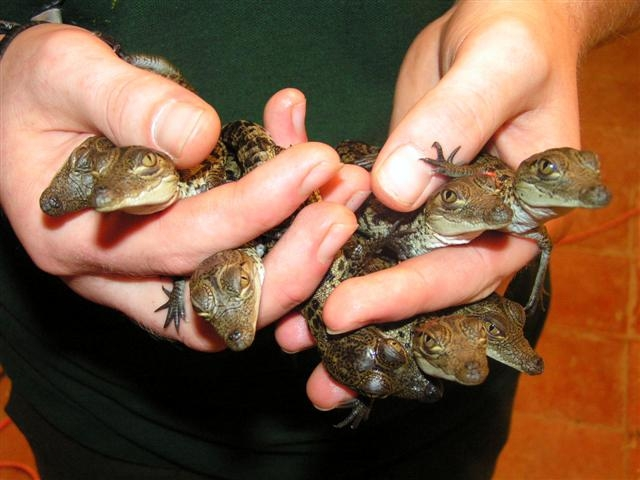
Baby Morelet's crocodiles at the Cotswold Wildlife Park, England

Breeding usually takes place between April and June, and the eggs are laid before the start of the rainy season. Morelet's crocodile is unique among North American crocodiles in that it builds mound nests only, and not mound and hole nests. These mound nests are about 3 m (10 ft) wide and 1 m (3 ft 3 in) high and can be found near the water or on floating vegetation. A female crocodile can lay between 20 and 45 eggs, and nests have been found containing eggs from more than one female. The eggs are buried, and the nests are guarded by females. The eggs usually hatch after 80 days, and hatchlings are normally about 17 cm (6 1/2 in) long. After the eggs have hatched, the female crocodile will carry her young to the water, where they are protected by both parents. Females are highly protective of their young and have reportedly been observed to aggressively displace intruders and humans if distress calls of the baby crocodiles are heard, and even father crocodiles have been observed to spring to the defense of young crocodiles. In captivity, juvenile crocodiles – but never hatchlings – are treated aggressively by adult crocodiles.

Hybridization between American and Morelet's crocodiles has been reported in Mexico and coastal Belize.

== Conservation ==
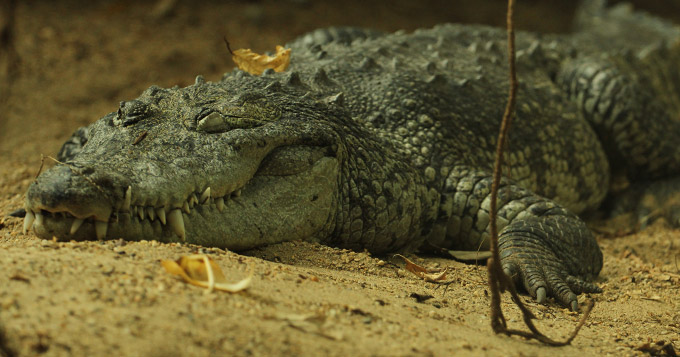
at Schönbrunn Zoo, Vienna

Morelet's crocodile has long been threatened by habitat destruction and illegal hunting. Both of these factors have significantly lowered its populations. It was hunted for its hide during the 1940s and 1950s because high-quality leather can be made from its skin.
