= Crocodylus halli =

Conservation status
- CITES Appendix II

Scientific classification
- Kingdom: Animalia
- Phylum: Chordata
- Class: Reptilia
- Order: Crocodylia
- Family: Crocodylidae
- Genus: Crocodylus
- Species: C. halli

Binomial name
- Crocodylus halli Murray, Russo, Zorrilla & McMahan, 2019

Species of reptile

Crocodylus halli, also known as Hall's New Guinea crocodile, is a proposed species of crocodile endemic to the island of New Guinea. It is found on the southern half of the island, south of the New Guinea highlands. It is named after Philip M. Hall, a researcher at the University of Florida who performed the initial studies to clarify the species' distinctiveness.

== Taxonomy ==
The proposed species was formerly considered a distinct population of the closely related New Guinea crocodile (C. novaeguineae), but morphological analysis of its skull structure (namely the postcrania and maxilla) has supported it being classified as its own species. The two species likely diverged within the last 3-8 million years, when the uplift of the New Guinea highlands created a barrier that divided them into separate populations.

=== Phylogeny ===
Below is a cladogram based on a 2018 tip dating study by Lee & Yates simultaneously using morphological, molecular (DNA sequencing), and stratigraphic (fossil age) data, as revised in 2021 after a paleogenomics study using DNA extracted from the extinct Voay. C. halli placement suggested in 2023 study by Sales-Oliveira et al.

- Crocodylus
  - - - - - - Crocodylus johnstoni Freshwater crocodile
      - - - - Crocodylus novaeguineae New Guinea crocodile
          - - Crocodylus halli Hall's New Guinea crocodile
        - - - Crocodylus mindorensis Philippine crocodile
    - - - - - Crocodylus porosus Saltwater crocodile
      - - - - Crocodylus siamensis Siamese crocodile
        - - - Crocodylus palustris Mugger crocodile
  - - - - - - Crocodylus suchus West African crocodile
    - - - - - Crocodylus niloticus Nile crocodile
      - - - - Crocodylus rhombifer Cuban crocodile
        - - - Crocodylus intermedius Orinoco crocodile
            - Crocodylus acutus American crocodile
          - - Crocodylus moreletii Morelet's crocodile

== Distribution ==
The species occurs in swamps, rivers, and lakes in the southern half of New Guinea. It is known to occasionally enter estuaries, such as the Fly River estuary. Variation is known from individuals across the range, with individuals from Lake Murray having a much wider skull than those from the Aramia River.

== Behavior ==
The species nests during New Guinea's wet season (November - April), in contrast to C. novaeguineae, which nests near the end of the dry season (July - November).

== In captivity ==
Three captive crocodiles at the St. Augustine Alligator Farm Zoological Park, formerly considered individuals of C. novaeguinae, were actually found to be C. halli while the study was being conducted. These were used to substantiate observed differences between C. halli and C. novaeguinae.

== Commercial use ==
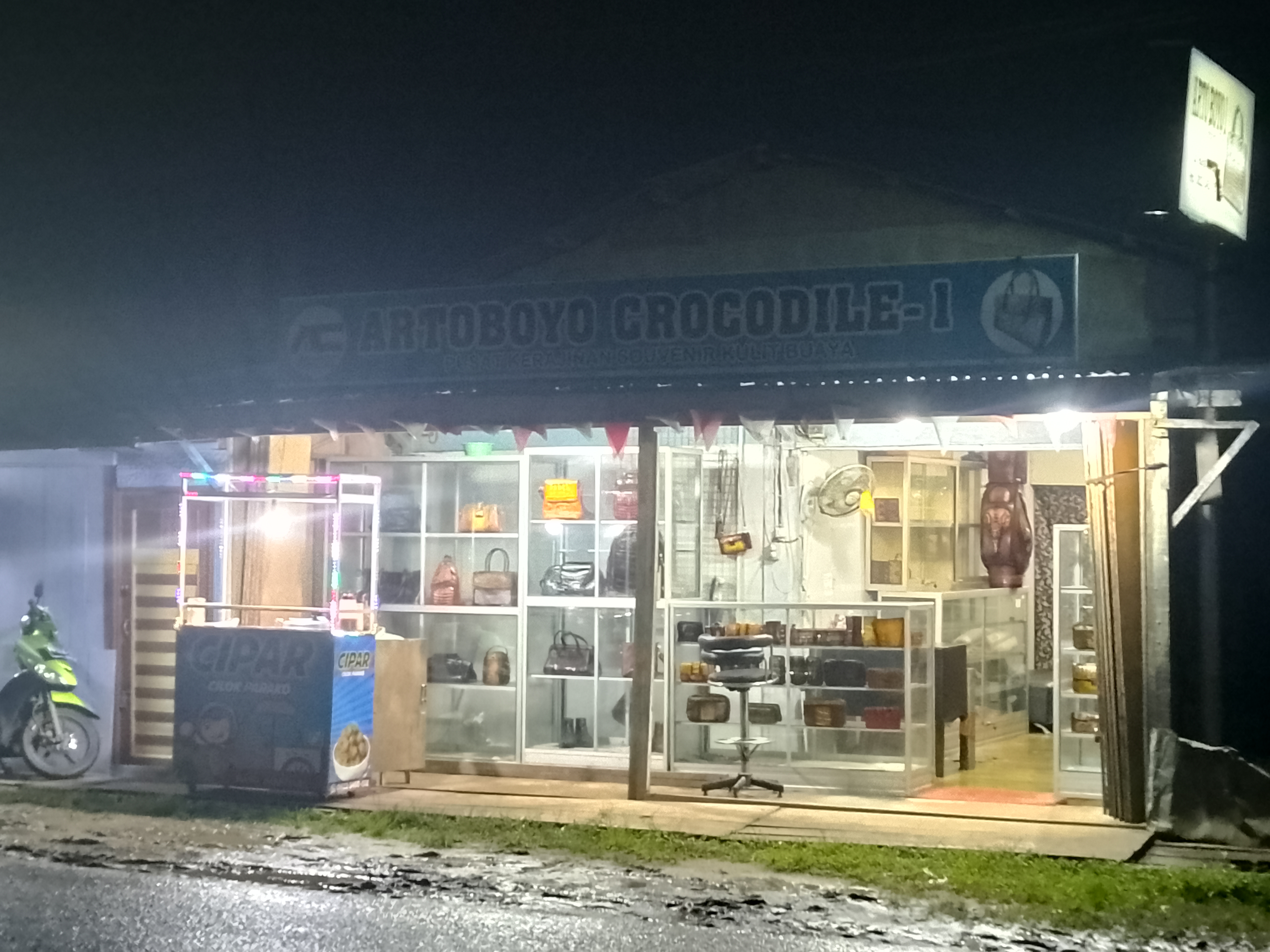
Crocodile skin artshop in Merauke

People in the city of Merauke, South Papua, are also known for processing the skin of this species of crocodile into various kinds of leather crafts, which are quite economically valuable and renowned for their quality.
