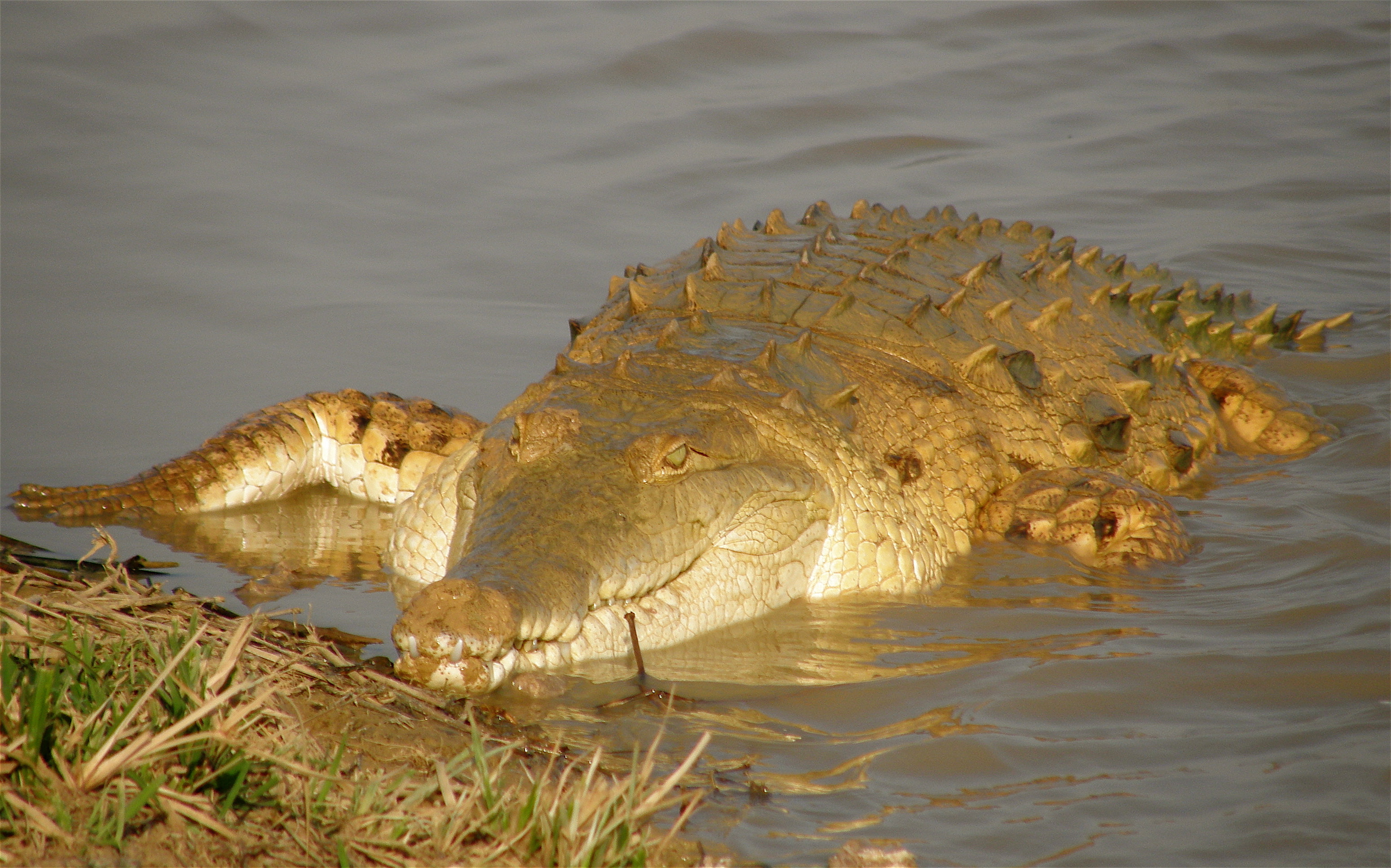
- Orinoco crocodile in Los Llanos, Venezuela

Conservation status
- Critically Endangered (IUCN 3.1)
- CITES Appendix I

Scientific classification
- Kingdom: Animalia
- Phylum: Chordata
- Class: Reptilia
- Order: Crocodilia
- Family: Crocodylidae
- Genus: Crocodylus
- Species: C. intermedius

Binomial name
- Crocodylus intermedius Graves, 1819
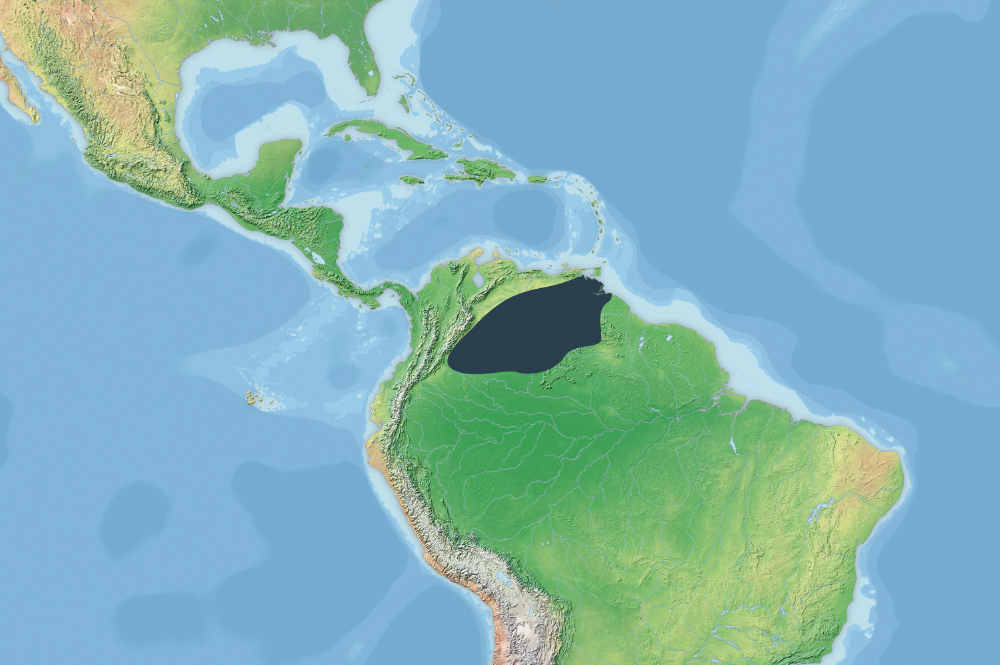
- Orinoco crocodile Range

= Orinoco crocodile =

Orinoco crocodile Temporal range: Late Pleistocene–Present, 0.1–0 Ma

Species of reptile

The Orinoco crocodile (Crocodylus intermedius) is a critically endangered crocodile which can only be found in the Orinoco river basin in Venezuela and Colombia. Extensively hunted for their skins in the 19th and 20th centuries, it is one of the most endangered species of crocodiles. It is a very large species of crocodilian; males have been reported up to 6.8 m (22 ft 4 in) in the past, weighing over 900 kg (2,000 lb), but such sizes do not exist today, 5.2 m (17 ft 1 in) being a more widely accepted maximum size. A large male today may attain 4.2 m (13 ft 9 in) in length and can weigh up to 450 kg (1,000 lb), while females are substantially smaller with the largest likely to weigh around 225 kg (496 lb). Sexual dimorphism is not as profound as in other crocodilian species. The coloration is light even in adults.

The ecology of the Orinoco crocodile is poorly documented in the wild, mostly due to its small population. It is thought to have a more piscivorous diet with an opportunistic nature, resulting in generalist predatory behaviour. It is an apex predator and preys on a variety of birds, mammals and reptiles, including caimans on occasion. Its prey base is mostly large predatory fish, challenging the general view by locals complaining about crocodiles hunting local fish to very low numbers. Reproduction takes place in the dry season when the water level is low. It is a hole nester and digs holes in the sand for its clutch of eggs. The females guard the nests and young for several years.

== Taxonomy ==
The genus Crocodylus likely originated in Africa and radiated outwards towards Southeast Asia and the Americas, although an Australia/Asia origin has also been considered. Phylogenetic evidence supports Crocodylus diverging from its closest recent relative, the extinct Voay of Madagascar, around 25 million years ago, near the Oligocene/Miocene boundary.

Below is a cladogram based on a 2018 tip dating study by Lee & Yates simultaneously using morphological, molecular (DNA sequencing), and stratigraphic (fossil age) data, as revised by the 2021 Hekkala et al. paleogenomics study using DNA extracted from the extinct Voay. Hall's New Guinea crocodile placement suggested in 2023 study by Sales-Oliveira et al.

- Crocodylus
  - - - - - - Crocodylus johnstoni Freshwater crocodile
      - - - - Crocodylus novaeguineae New Guinea crocodile
          - - Crocodylus halli Hall's New Guinea crocodile
        - - - Crocodylus mindorensis Philippine crocodile
    - - - - - Crocodylus porosus Saltwater crocodile
      - - - - Crocodylus siamensis Siamese crocodile
        - - - Crocodylus palustris Mugger crocodile
  - - - - - - Crocodylus suchus West African crocodile
    - - - - - Crocodylus niloticus Nile crocodile
      - - - - Crocodylus rhombifer Cuban crocodile
        - - - Crocodylus intermedius Orinoco crocodile
            - Crocodylus acutus American crocodile
          - - Crocodylus moreletii Morelet's crocodile

== Distribution and habitat ==
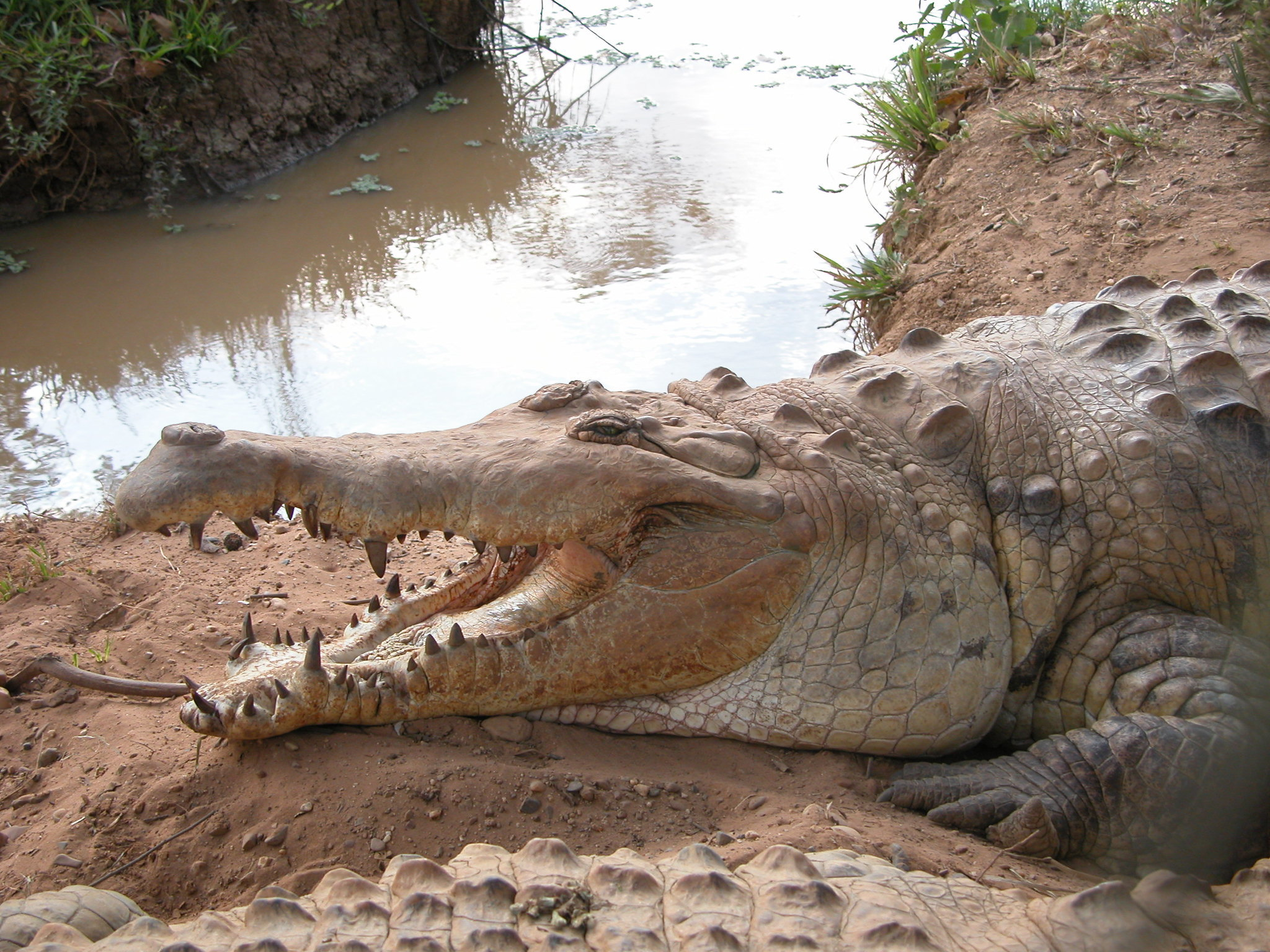
In Venezuela

This species is restricted to the middle and lower reaches of the Orinoco river basin in Venezuela and Colombia. They have been occasionally reported on the island of Trinidad, but this has not been confirmed, and witnesses may have mistaken an American crocodile for the rarer species. This crocodile was once thought to have inhabited a wide range of riparian habitats, from tropical forests to the streams of the Andes foothills. Today, this species is restricted to the Llanos savanna and associated seasonal freshwater rivers.

== Characteristics ==
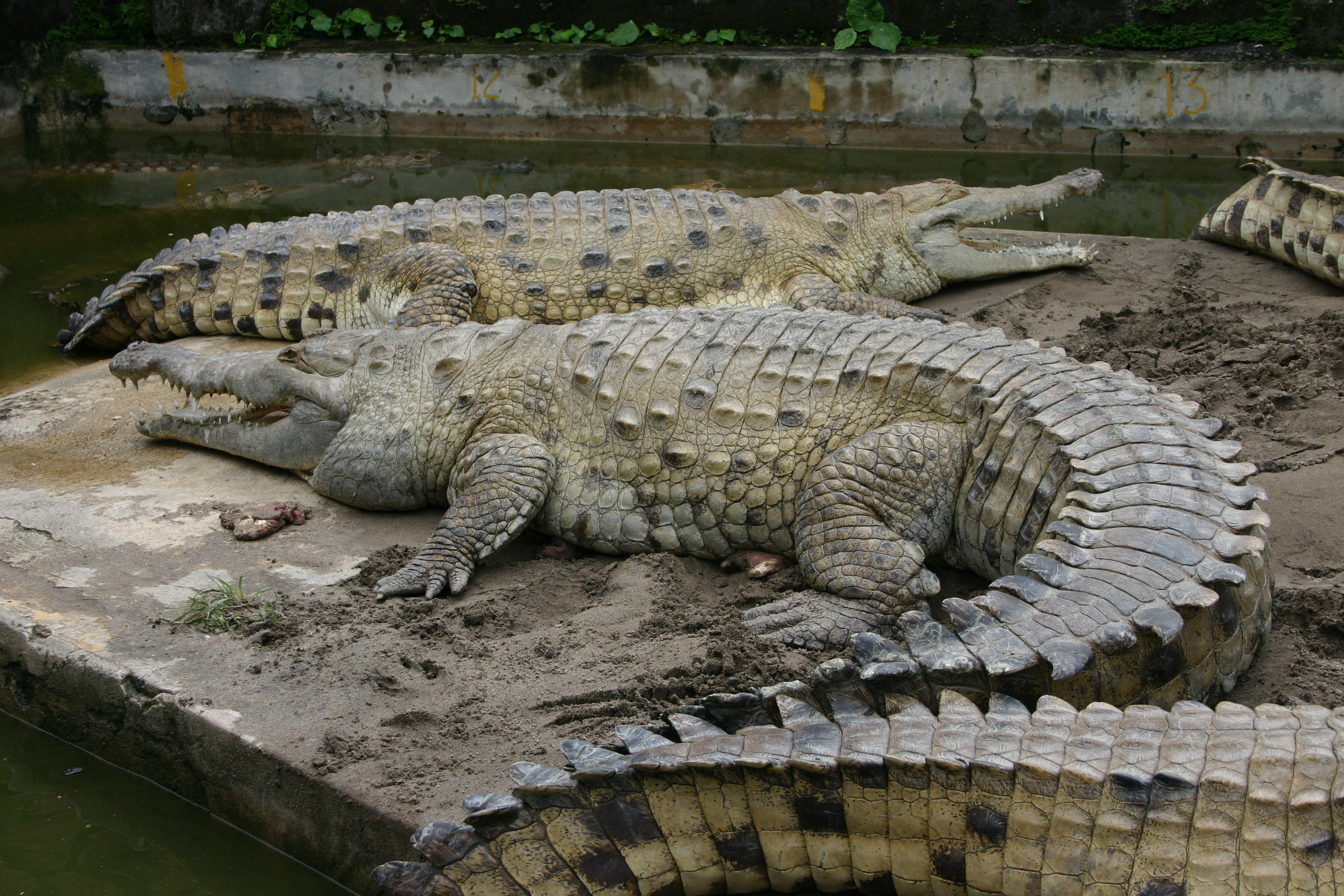
Orinoco crocodile in Villavicencio, Colombia

The Orinoco crocodile can be recognised by its relatively long snout, which is narrower than that of the somewhat similar-looking American crocodile. This species generally has a pale tan hide, though at least three coloration variations are known, with some almost completely yellowish, and some a dark brownish-gray. The skin can change colour over long periods of time; this phenomenon has been recorded in other species that can gradually change the amount of melanin in their skin. These crocodiles have dark-brown markings, which present as more pronounced bands in younger specimens and as scattered markings on mature ones. One individual measuring 3.4 m (11 ft 2 in) and weighing 182 kg (401 lb) had a bite force of 6,276 N (1,411 lb_{f}).

=== Size ===
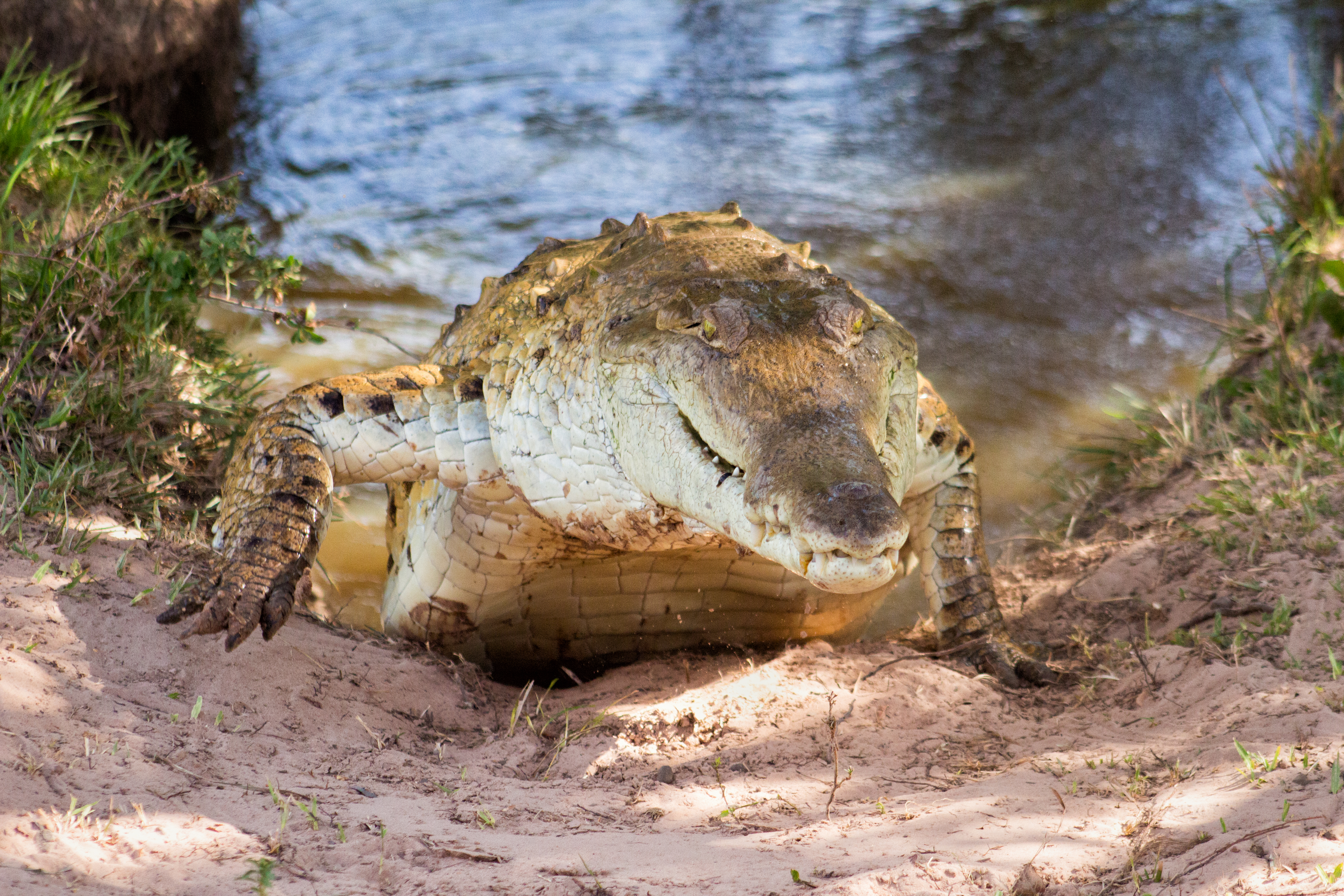
In spite of its somewhat narrow snout, the Orinoco crocodile is both a formidable apex predator and one of the world's largest reptiles.

The Orinoco crocodile ranks among the largest living reptiles, as well as the largest predator in the Americas. It is arguably, on average, the largest crocodilian in the Americas; while American crocodiles, black caimans and the American alligator may approach similar dimensions, the Orinoco crocodile may be (or had been, when in healthy numbers) slightly longer. Given its possible maximum sizes, the Orinoco crocodile may rank as the third largest extant true crocodile, after the saltwater crocodile and Nile crocodile (which is closely related to it, despite its substantially different range), and additionally rank 4th amongst all extant crocodilians behind the gharial, though there is little to suggest that Orinoco specimens in modern times can rival these species. Sexual maturity for Orinoco crocodiles is obtained for females at around 2.5 m (8 ft 2 in) while that of males seems to be obtained around 3 m (9 ft 10 in) length, with most adult crocodiles of the species exceeding 93 kg (205 lb). Average length of wild adult females from 1985 to 1992 was found to be 3.06 m (10 ft 0 in) while that of males is not known to have been surveyed at that time. If not culled by humans, mature males easily exceed 3.6 m (12 ft) and attain a length of as much as 4.1 to 4.8 m (13 to 16 ft) as they grow throughout life, perhaps weighing 500 to 700 kg (1,100 to 1,500 lb) in big specimens, while females may grow over the expected size of 3.25 m (10 ft 8 in) in length and may sometimes exceed 225 kg (496 lb). According to Guinness Records, the average length of adults that they were able to examine was only 3 m (9 ft 10 in) and the largest specimen found firsthand was 4.2 m (13 ft 9 in). In captivity, at the Roberto Franco Tropical Biological Station (EBTRF), the largest male was recorded at 4.2 m (13 ft 9 in) and weighed 428 kg (944 lb), and maximum size recorded for females was 3.9 m (12 ft 10 in) long and 195 kg (430 lb) in weight. In Venezuela, males have been reported to reach at least 4.1 m (13 ft 5 in) in length and weigh 380 kg (840 lb), while females reach up to 3.2 m (10 ft 6 in) and weigh up to 210 kg (460 lb). The largest specimen historically reported was shot in 1800, and allegedly measured at 6.78 m (22 ft 3 in), although the source is considered reliable, unfortunately, no voucher specimen is known from this. Because of extensive hunting for their skins in the 20th century, such giants do not exist today, and modern Orinoco crocodiles have not been reported to exceed 5.1 m (16 ft 9 in) in length. Merchán listed the maximum total length attainable for a male as 5.2 m (17 ft 1 in) and the maximum length of a female as 3.6 m (11 ft 10 in).

== Behavior and ecology ==
=== Hunting and diet ===
The hunting strategy of the Orinoco crocodile

Little study has gone into the dietary biology of Orinoco crocodiles but from eye-witness accounts and partial studies from captivity and crocodile farms, the majority of the Orinoco crocodile's diet appears to consist of large fish. The species' relatively narrow snout is ideally suited to minimize water resistance in capturing such aquatic prey. Juveniles prey on invertebrates and small fish, while large individuals prey on fish, terrestrial vertebrates and birds. Despite having a rather elongated skull, its base snout is wide, hinting to a generalist diet. Additionally, as they age, mature males in particular appear to manifest a broadened snout, presumably due to a shift to being able to take larger prey as is seen in several other large crocodile species. It stalks both aquatic and terrestrial prey. Prey includes South American tapirs, redtail catfish and large adult green anacondas. Similar to many of the larger crocodile species, the Orinoco crocodile has also been observed catching and eating smaller species of crocodilians, such as adult common caimans and sometimes cannibalizing smaller individuals of its own kind.

Attacks on humans have been reported, but this is highly unlikely to be a common behavior today, given the very small population of the species and its relative isolation from large human settlements. Historically attacks were not unusual and on his trip to the region in 1800, natives told Alexander von Humboldt that two or three adult people were killed per year by Orinoco crocodiles. A small number of better documented fatal attacks were reported in the 1900s–1930s when the species was still relatively common. The only well-documented recent attack, on a fisherman in 2009, was serious but not fatal. A second survivor was reported in 2011 to live in La Palmita at the Cojedes River, but any details of this attack (including when exactly it happened) are lacking.

=== Reproduction ===
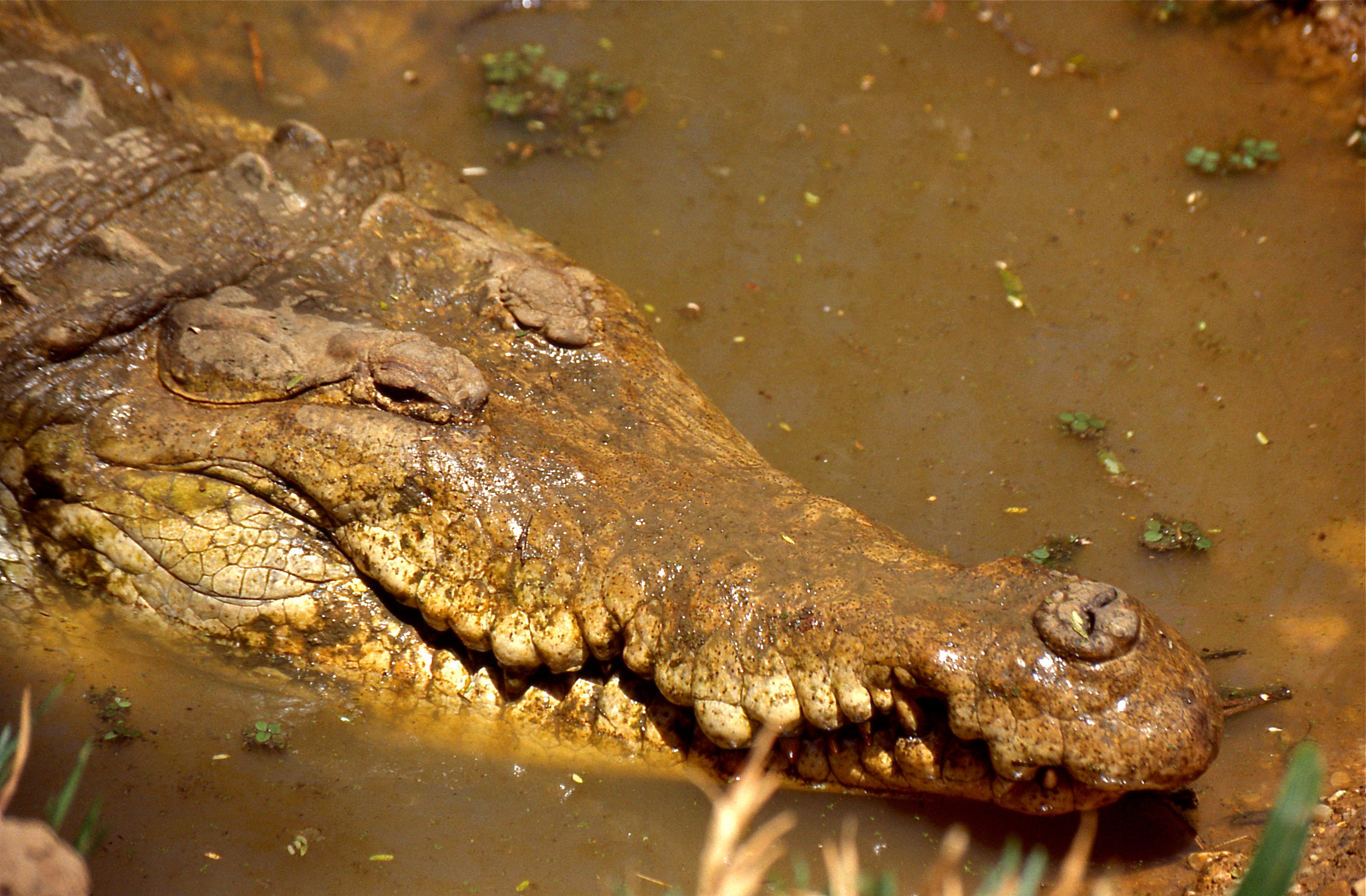
Orinoco crocodile's head

When water recedes in the dry season, Orinoco crocodiles retreat to burrows they excavate into the riverbanks. The adult pair mates during the drier period of the year. Adult males attract the females by roaring. The females often outnumber the males two to one and appear to select the males with the deepest roars. In a reintroduced population, only 6 of 14 potential adult males parented over 90% of eggs laid. Usually 14 weeks after mating, the female crocodile will dig a nest and lay about 40 eggs. It is a hole-nester, and it usually makes its nest on a sand bank. The eggs incubate under a mixture of soil and rotting vegetation for around three months. The eggs experience temperature-dependent sex determination. The most common predator of buried eggs are tegu lizards although the tegus are sometimes caught and killed by the mother crocodile. During the night the young hatch and call to their mother; she digs them out of the nest and carries them to the water, which is considerably higher at this point. Young Orinoco crocodiles are often at risk from predation by American black vultures, tegu lizards, green anacondas, caimans, South American coatis, jaguars, and other carnivores, though these species are sometimes also caught and killed by the defending mother crocodile. Adults have no predators except for humans. Females have defended pods of juveniles for over three years, though closer to one year to independence is generally most common. A study of captive Orinoco crocodiles noted the aggressive behavior of adults while nesting and noted that the normally relatively docile crocodilians could not be approached while they were actively brooding. Without persecution, it is possible that Orinoco crocodiles may reach a lifespan of 70–80 years.

== Conservation status ==
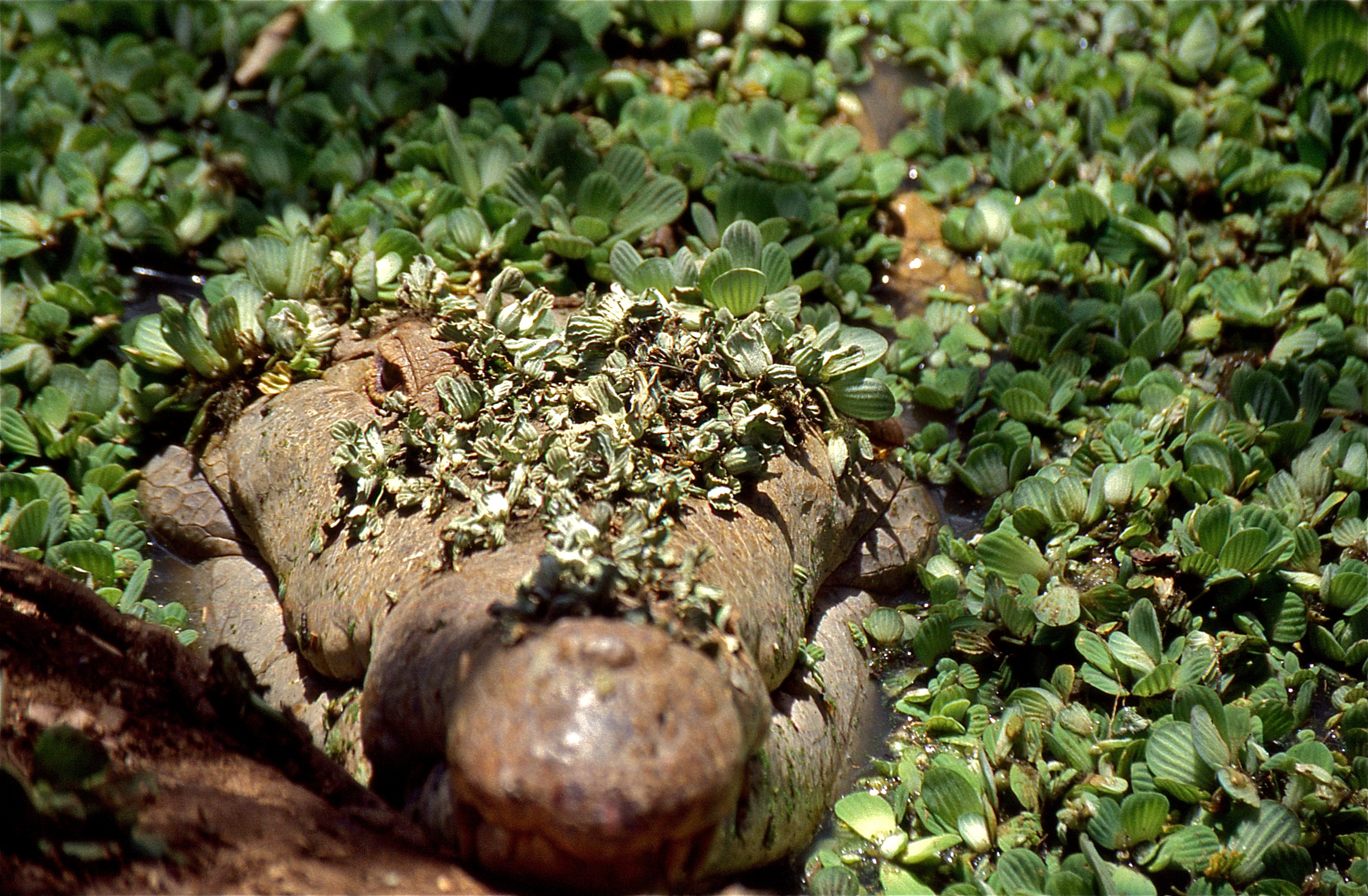
A Orinoco crocodile near its wild range in Los Llanos, Venezuela in a captive breeding program intended to bolster the severely depleted population of these crocodiles.

The Orinoco crocodile is highly endangered due to excessive hunting for its hide. During the 1940s to the 1960s, thousands of these animals were slaughtered in the Orinoco River and the Llanos wetlands, and the species came very close to extinction. The Orinoco crocodile was given protected status in the 1970s, but has yet to recover. Today, it is protected both in Colombia and Venezuela, and also included on Appendix I by CITES. In addition to hunting for its hide, more recent threats include the collection of juveniles for sale in the live animal trade, pollution, and the proposal of a dam in the upper Orinoco River region. Another problem is the increased population of spectacled caimans, a smaller crocodilian that can outcompete the Orinoco crocodile for fish due to its much larger population and much more accelerated breeding rates.

It's unclear how many individuals remain in the wild, but estimates range between 250 and 1500. The largest subpopulation in Venezuela is in Cojedes and Sarare, with fewer than 500 adults remaining. A number of other smaller subpopulations exist.

In November 2007, 50 individuals were held in zoos registered by Species360, of which the largest population, 35 individuals, were kept in the Dallas World Aquarium. Additionally, a large number of individuals are held at captive-breeding facilities in Venezuela. Since the early 1990s, a large number of hatchlings have been released both into private ranchlands (especially in the Llanos where nature-oriented tourism is important for the local economy) and in national parks in Venezuela. While six Venezuelan captive-breeding programs continue today, many are plagued by lack of funds or staff, as well as conflicts between private and state-owned facilities.

The Orinoco crocodile became part of Proyecto Vida Silvestre, a program launched in 2014 to protect 10 wildlife species of Colombia's Llanos. Thanks to that program, between May 2015 and February 2016, 41 orinoco crocodiles were reintroduced at El Tuparro National Natural Park in eastern Colombia.
