= Gaius Cassius Longinus (disambiguation) =

Gaius Cassius Longinus (c. 86 BC – 3 October 42 BC) was a Roman senator and general who plotted to assassinate Julius Caesar on 15 March 44 BC.

Gaius Cassius Longinus may also refer to:

- Gaius Cassius Longinus (consul 171 BC), fought in the Third Macedonian War
- Gaius Cassius Longinus (consul 96 BC), mentioned by Cicero
- Gaius Cassius Longinus (consul 73 BC), passed the lex Terentia Cassia
- Gaius Cassius Longinus (consul 30), husband of Junia Lepida

== See also ==
- Cassius (disambiguation)
- Cassius Longinus (disambiguation)
- Longinus (disambiguation)
