= Cassius =

Cassius may refer to:

== People ==
=== Ancient world ===
- Cassius, an ancient Roman family name: see Cassia gens
  - Gaius Cassius Longinus (died 42 BC), Roman senator and a leader of Julius Caesar's assassination
  - Avidius Cassius (130–175), usurper Roman emperor
- Cassius Chaerea, 1st-century Roman army soldier and officer in the Praetorian Guard and assassin of Emperor Caligula
- Cassius Dio (c. AD 155 or 163/164–after 229), Roman historian
- Cassius Longinus (disambiguation)
- Cassius of Clermont (died c. 260), Roman senator and Christian martyr
- Cassius of Narni (died 558), Bishop of Narni

=== Modern world ===
- Cassius Clay (1942–2016), birth name of American boxer Muhammad Ali
- Cassius Marcellus Clay Sr. (1912–1989), father of the boxer
- Cassius Marcellus Clay (1810–1903), American abolitionist, nicknamed the "Lion of White Hall"
- Cassius Stanley (born 1999), American basketball player
- Cassius Turvey (2007–2022), Aboriginal Australian boy killed in Perth
- Cassius Winston (born 1998), American basketball player
- Cassius, pen-name of Michael Foot, British politician and writer
- Saint Cassius (musician), stage name of American musician Khalil Walton

== Fictional characters ==
- Cassius au Bellona, in Pierce Brown's Red Rising series of novels
- Cassius Bright, in the video game The Legend of Heroes: Trails in the Sky
- Cassius Green, in the film Sorry to Bother You

== Music ==
- Cassius (band), a French electronic music duo
- "Cassius" (song), a 2008 song by Foals
- "Cassius", a 2017 song on the album Crack-Up by Fleet Foxes

== Other uses ==
- Cassius (crocodile), the world's largest captive crocodile
- Team Cassius, a competitor in the British version of Robot Wars
- Cassius Chrome, a house robot in the British version of Robot Wars

== See also ==
- Kassius, a given name
- Kasius, a recurring character in season 5 of Agents of S.H.I.E.L.D.
