= Sweetheart (crocodile) =

Australian saltwater crocodile

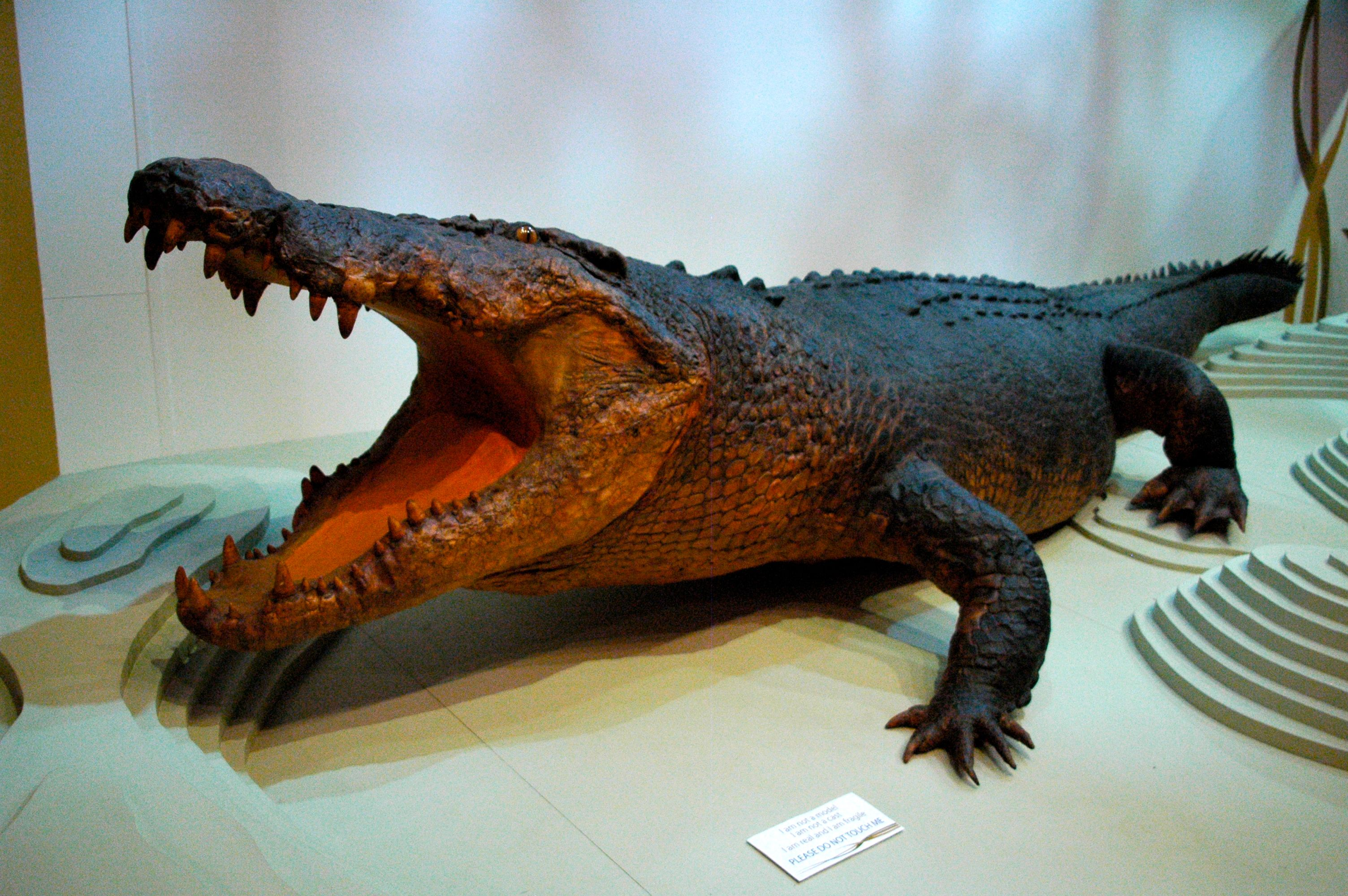
Sweetheart at the Museum and Art Gallery of the Northern Territory

Sweetheart was the name given to a 5.1 m (17 ft) male saltwater crocodile (Crocodylus porosus) which Northern Territory folk legend claims was responsible for a series of attacks on boats in Australia in the 1970s.

== History ==
Sweetheart first rose to prominence around 1974 and was dubbed by locals as the "heavyweight champion" of Sweets Billabong—where he gets his name—in the Northern Territory's Finniss River, south west of Darwin. He frequently attacked outboard motors, dinghies, and fishing boats, but there is no known case of his attacking humans. In July 1979, Sweetheart was finally caught alive by a team from the Territory Parks and Wildlife Commission due to fears for human safety, but died while being transported when he became tangled with a log. The cause of death was later attributed to a slow drowning, probably due to being tranquilised with the sedative Flaxedil.

The crocodile's mounted body was prepared for an Australian tour by Ian Archibald and eventually placed on permanent display at the Museum and Art Gallery of the Northern Territory. The story of Sweetheart was interpreted with considerable artistic licence by filmmaker Greg McLean in his 2007 creature feature Rogue, starring Michael Vartan, Sam Worthington and Radha Mitchell. Sweetheart's dimensions were expanded by two metres in the film, which saw Academy Award-winning creature designer John Cox win an AFI Award for his construction of the crocodile used on screen.

== See also ==
- Cassius, a 5.48-metre (18 ft) saltwater crocodile (Crocodylus porosus)
