= Kassius =

Kassius may refer to:

- Kassius Nelson (born 1997), English actress and playwright
- Kassius Robertson (born 1994), Canadian basketball player
- Kassius Konstantine, a Star Wars Imperial Navy admiral
- Kassius Ohno, a ring name of American professional wrestler William Spradlin (born 1979)

== See also ==
- Cassius (disambiguation)
- Kasius, a recurring character in season 5 of Agents of S.H.I.E.L.D.
