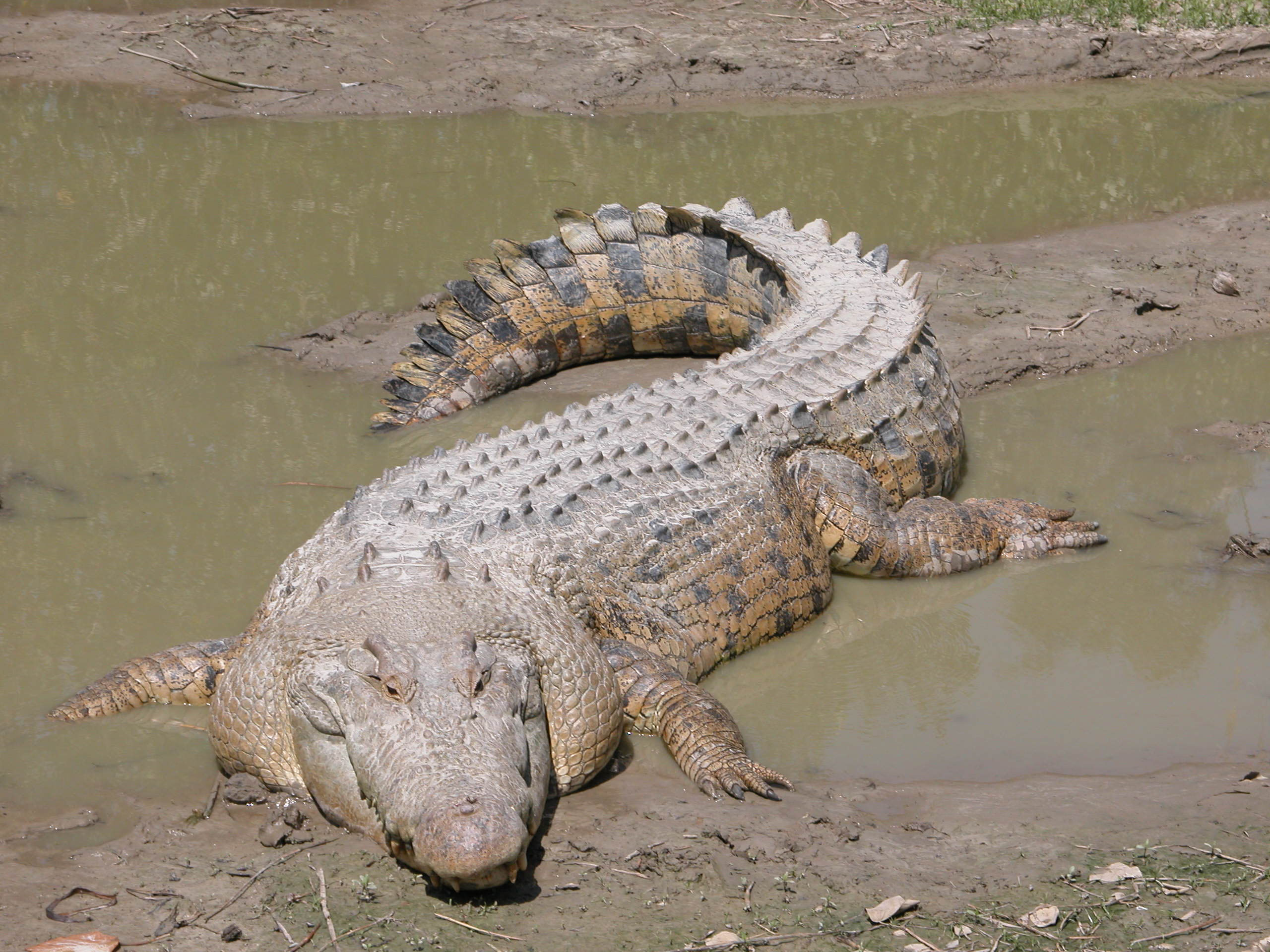
- Male
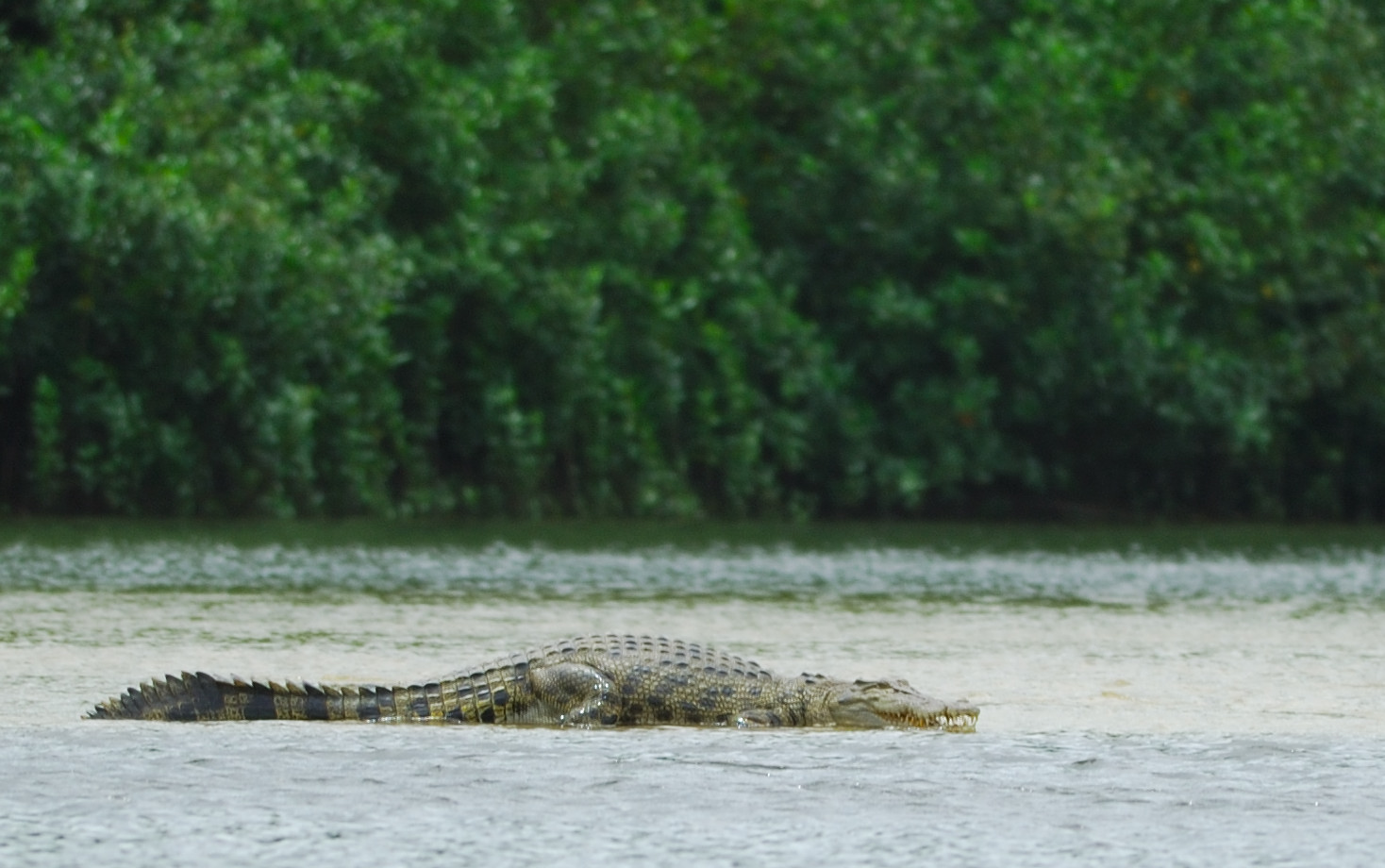
- Female

Conservation status
- Least Concern (IUCN 3.1)
- CITES Appendix I (Note: Except populations of Australia, Indonesia, Malaysia and Papua New Guinea which are included in Appendix II.)

Scientific classification
- Kingdom: Animalia
- Phylum: Chordata
- Class: Reptilia
- Order: Crocodylia
- Family: Crocodylidae
- Genus: Crocodylus
- Species: C. porosus

Binomial name
- Crocodylus porosus Schneider, 1801
- Range of the saltwater crocodile

= Saltwater crocodile =

Saltwater crocodile Temporal range: Pliocene–Present, 5.3–0 Ma

Species of reptile

The saltwater crocodile (Crocodylus porosus) is a crocodilian native to saltwater habitats, brackish wetlands and freshwater rivers from India's east coast across Southeast Asia and the Sundaland to northern Australia and Micronesia. It has been listed as Least Concern on the IUCN Red List since 1996. It was hunted for its skin throughout its range up to the 1970s, and is threatened by illegal killing and habitat loss. It is regarded as dangerous to humans.

The saltwater crocodile is the largest living reptile. Males can grow to a weight of 1,000–1,500 kg (2,200–3,300 lb) and a length of 6 m (20 ft), rarely exceeding 6.3 m (21 ft). Females are much smaller and rarely surpass 3 m (9.8 ft). It is also called the estuarine crocodile, Indo-Pacific crocodile, marine crocodile, sea crocodile, and, informally, the saltie. A large and opportunistic hypercarnivorous apex predator, they ambush most of their prey and then drown or swallow it whole. They will prey on almost any animal that enters their territory, including other predators such as sharks, varieties of freshwater and saltwater fish including pelagic species, invertebrates such as crustaceans, various amphibians, other reptiles, birds, and mammals.

== Taxonomy and evolution ==
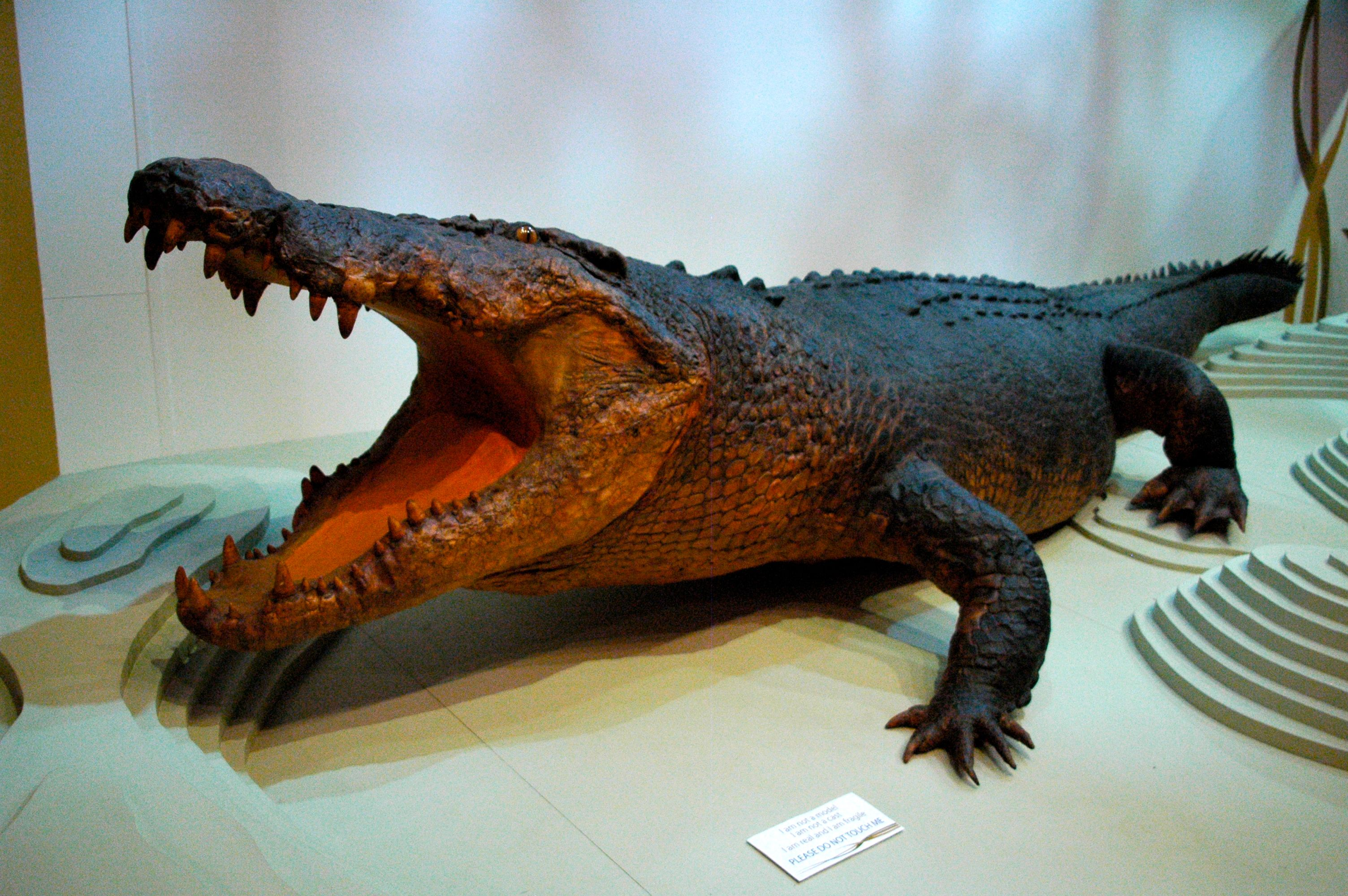
Sweetheart, a saltwater crocodile from Finnis River in northern Australia proposed as Crocodilus pethericki in 1985

Crocodilus porosus was the scientific name proposed by Johann Gottlob Theaenus Schneider who described a zoological specimen in 1801. In the 19th and 20th centuries, several saltwater crocodile specimens were described with the following names:

- Crocodilus biporcatus proposed by Georges Cuvier in 1807 were 23 saltwater crocodile specimens from India, Java and Timor.
- Crocodilus biporcatus raninus proposed by Salomon Müller and Hermann Schlegel in 1844 was a crocodile from Borneo.
- Crocodylus porosus australis proposed by Paulus Edward Pieris Deraniyagala in 1953 was a specimen from Australia.
- Crocodylus pethericki proposed by Richard Wells and C. Ross Wellington in 1985 was a large-bodied, relatively large-headed and short-tailed crocodile specimen collected in 1979 in the Finnis River, Northern Territory. This purported species was later considered to be a misinterpretation of the physiological changes that very large male crocodiles undergo. However, Wells and Wellington's assertion that the Australian saltwater crocodiles may be distinctive enough from Asian saltwater crocodiles to warrant subspecies status has been considered to possibly bear validity.

Currently, the saltwater crocodile is considered a monotypic species.

=== Evolution ===
Fossil remains of a saltwater crocodile excavated in northern Queensland were dated to the Pliocene. The saltwater crocodile's closest extant (living) relatives are the Siamese crocodile and the mugger crocodile.

The genus Crocodylus was thought to have evolved in Australia and Asia. Results of a phylogenetic study supports its likely origin in Africa and later radiation towards Southeast Asia and the Americas; it genetically diverged from its closest recent relative, the extinct Voay of Madagascar, around 25 million years ago near the boundary between the Oligocene and Miocene.

=== Phylogeny ===
Below is a cladogram based on a 2018 tip dating study by Lee & Yates simultaneously using morphological, molecular (DNA sequencing), and stratigraphic (fossil age) data, as revised in 2021 after a paleogenomics study using DNA extracted from the extinct Voay. Hall's New Guinea crocodile placement suggested in 2023 study by Sales-Oliveira et al.

- Crocodylus
  - - - - - - Crocodylus johnstoni Freshwater crocodile
      - - - - Crocodylus novaeguineae New Guinea crocodile
          - - Crocodylus halli Hall's New Guinea crocodile
        - - - Crocodylus mindorensis Philippine crocodile
    - - - - - Crocodylus porosus Saltwater crocodile
      - - - - Crocodylus siamensis Siamese crocodile
        - - - Crocodylus palustris Mugger crocodile
  - - - - - - Crocodylus suchus West African crocodile
    - - - - - Crocodylus niloticus Nile crocodile
      - - - - Crocodylus rhombifer Cuban crocodile
        - - - Crocodylus intermedius Orinoco crocodile
            - Crocodylus acutus American crocodile
          - - Crocodylus moreletii Morelet's crocodile

== Description ==
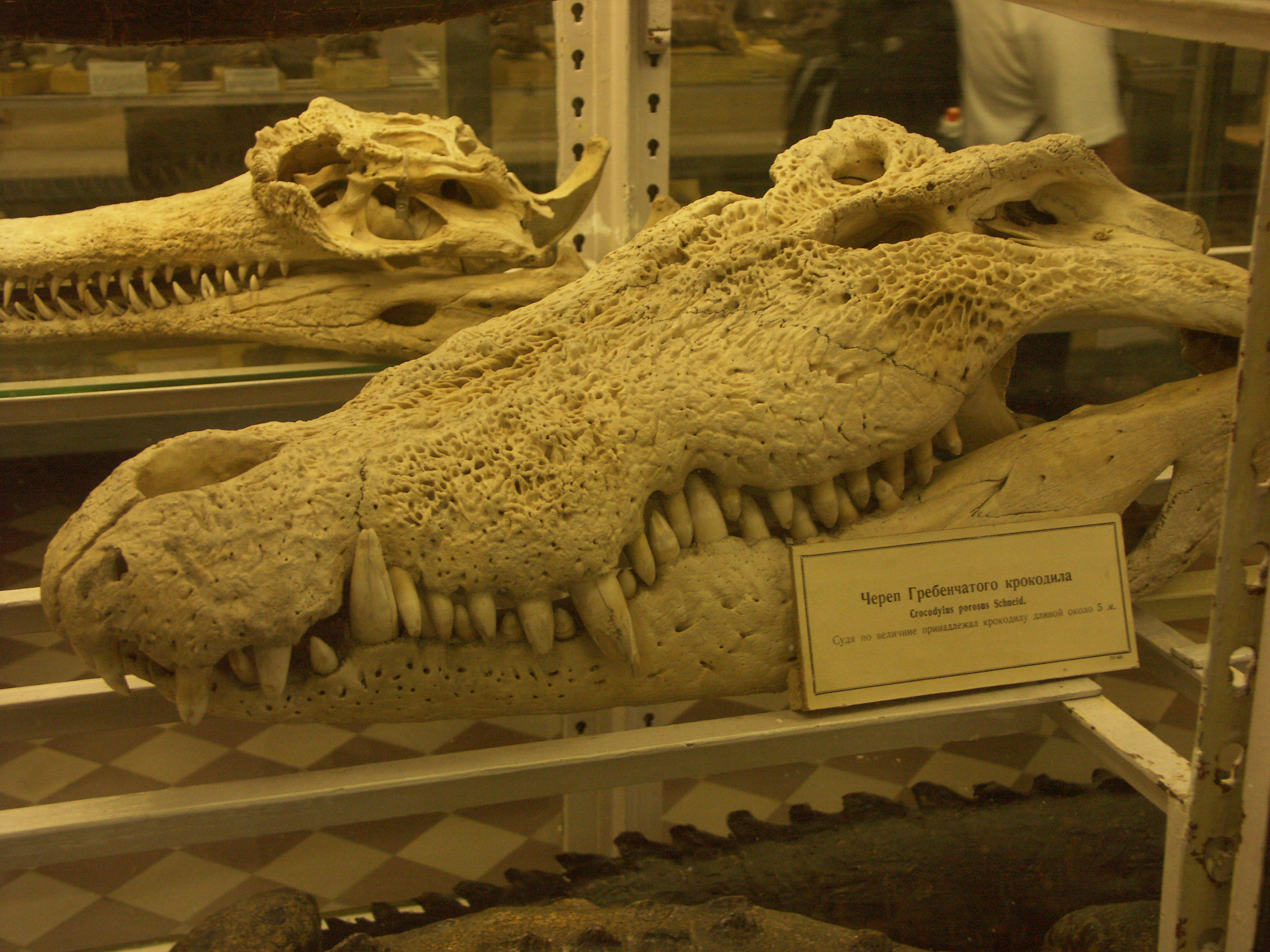
Saltwater crocodile skull from The Museum of Zoology, Saint Petersburg. Note the considerably more slender skull of a gharial in the background.

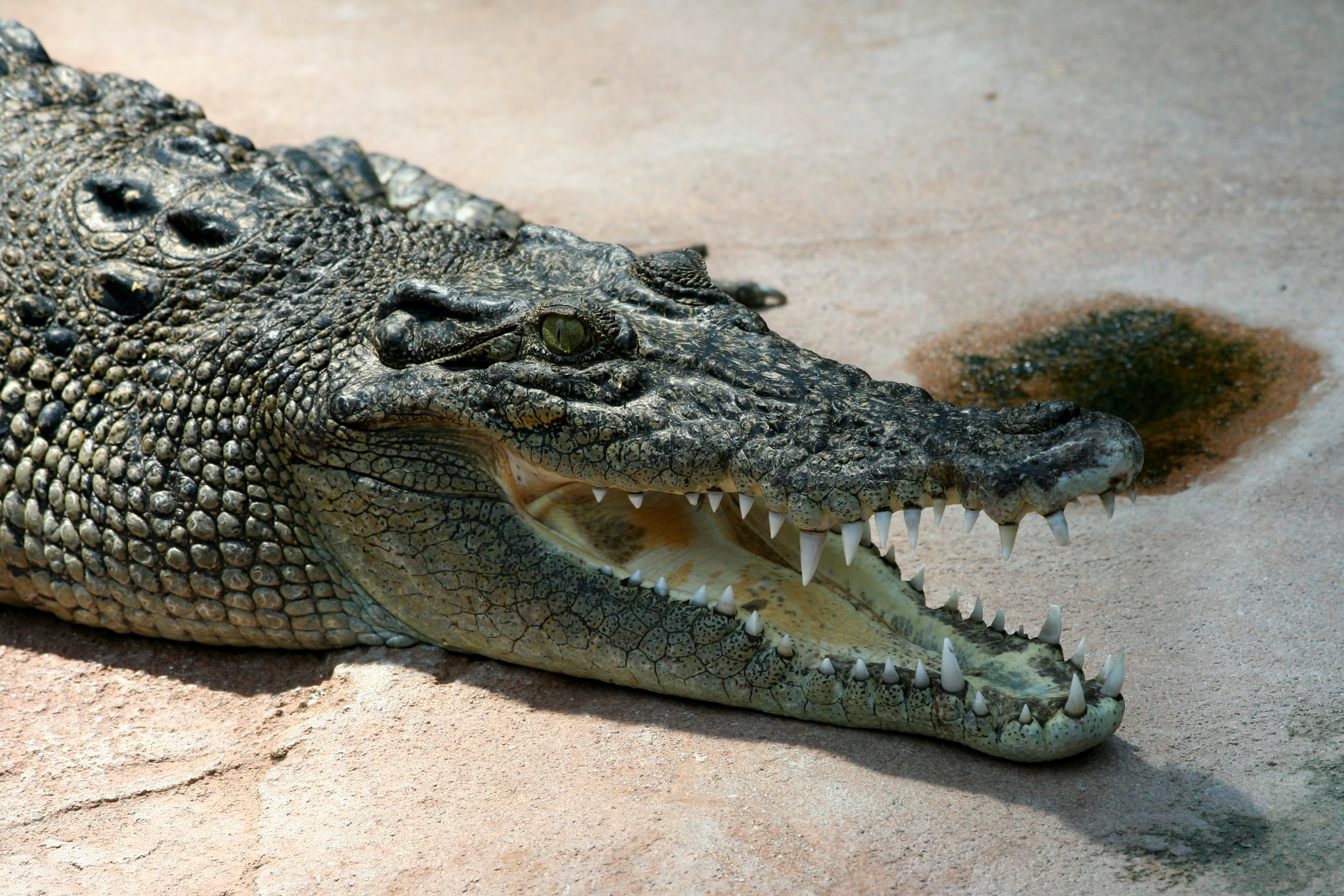
Head of a saltwater crocodile

The saltwater crocodile has a wide snout compared to most crocodiles. However, it has a longer snout than the mugger crocodile (C. palustris); its length is twice its width at the base. A pair of ridges runs from the eyes along the centre of the snout. The scales are oval in shape and the scutes are either small compared to other species or commonly are entirely absent. In addition, an obvious gap is also present between the cervical and dorsal shields, and small, triangular scutes are present between the posterior edges of the large, transversely arranged scutes in the dorsal shield. The relative lack of scutes is considered an asset useful to distinguish saltwater crocodiles in captivity or in illicit leather trading, as well as in the few areas in the field where sub-adult or younger saltwater crocodiles may need to be distinguished from other crocodiles. It has fewer armour plates on its neck than other crocodilians.

The adult saltwater crocodile's broad body contrasts with that of most other lean crocodiles, leading to early unverified assumptions the reptile was an alligator.

Young saltwater crocodiles are pale yellow in colour with black stripes and spots on their bodies and tails. This colouration lasts for several years until the crocodiles mature into adults. The colour as an adult is much darker greenish-drab, with a few lighter tan or grey areas sometimes apparent. Several colour variations are known and some adults may retain fairly pale skin, whereas others may be so dark as to appear blackish. The ventral surface is white or yellow in colour in saltwater crocodiles of all ages. Stripes are present on the lower sides of their bodies, but do not extend onto their bellies. Their tails are grey with dark bands.

=== Size ===
The size of various saltwater crocodile individuals with a human for scale

The weight of a crocodile increases approximately cubically as length increases (see square–cube law). This explains why individuals at 6 m (20 ft) weigh more than twice as much as individuals at 5 m (16 ft). In crocodiles, linear growth eventually decreases and they start getting bulkier at a certain point.

Saltwater crocodiles are the largest extant riparian predators in the world. However, they start life fairly small. Newly hatched saltwater crocodiles measure about 28 cm (11 in) long and weigh an average of 71 g (2.5 oz). These sizes and ages are almost identical to those at average sexual maturity in Nile crocodiles, despite the fact that average adult male saltwater crocodiles are considerably larger than average adult male Nile crocodiles.

The largest skull of a saltwater crocodile that could be scientifically verified was of a specimen in the Muséum national d'Histoire naturelle, collected in Cambodia. Its skull was 76 cm (30 in) long and 48 cm (19 in) wide near its base, with 98.3 cm (38.7 in) long mandibles; its length is not known, but based on skull-to-length ratios of large saltwater crocodiles its length was presumably in the 6.7–7 m (22–23 ft) range, though it could have had an exceptionally large skull or may not have the same skull-to-total-length ratios as other large saltwater crocodiles. If detached from the body, the head of a large male crocodile can weigh over 200 kg (440 lb), including the large muscles and tendons at the base of the skull that lend the crocodile its massive biting strength. The largest tooth measured 9 cm (3.5 in) in length. Other crocodilians like the gharial (Gavialis gangeticus) and the false gharial (Tomistoma schlegelii) have a proportionately longer skull, but both their skulls and their bodies are less massive than in the saltwater crocodile.

==== Male size ====
An adult male saltwater crocodile, from young adults to older individuals, typically ranges 3.5 to 5 m (11 ft 6 in – 16 ft 5 in) in length and weighs 200 to 1,100 kg (440 to 2,430 lb). On average, adult males range 4.0 to 4.5 m (13 ft 1 in – 14 ft 9 in) in length and weigh 408 to 770 kg (899 to 1,698 lb). However average size largely depends on the location, habitat, and human interactions and thus varies from one study to another. In 1993, in a study conducted (published in 1998), eleven saltwater crocodiles were found to have measured 2.1 to 5.5 m (6 ft 11 in – 18 ft 1 in) and weighed between 32 and 1,010 kg (71 and 2,227 lb). Very large, aged males can exceed 6 m (19 ft 8 in) in length and presumably weigh up to 2,000 kg (4,400 lb).

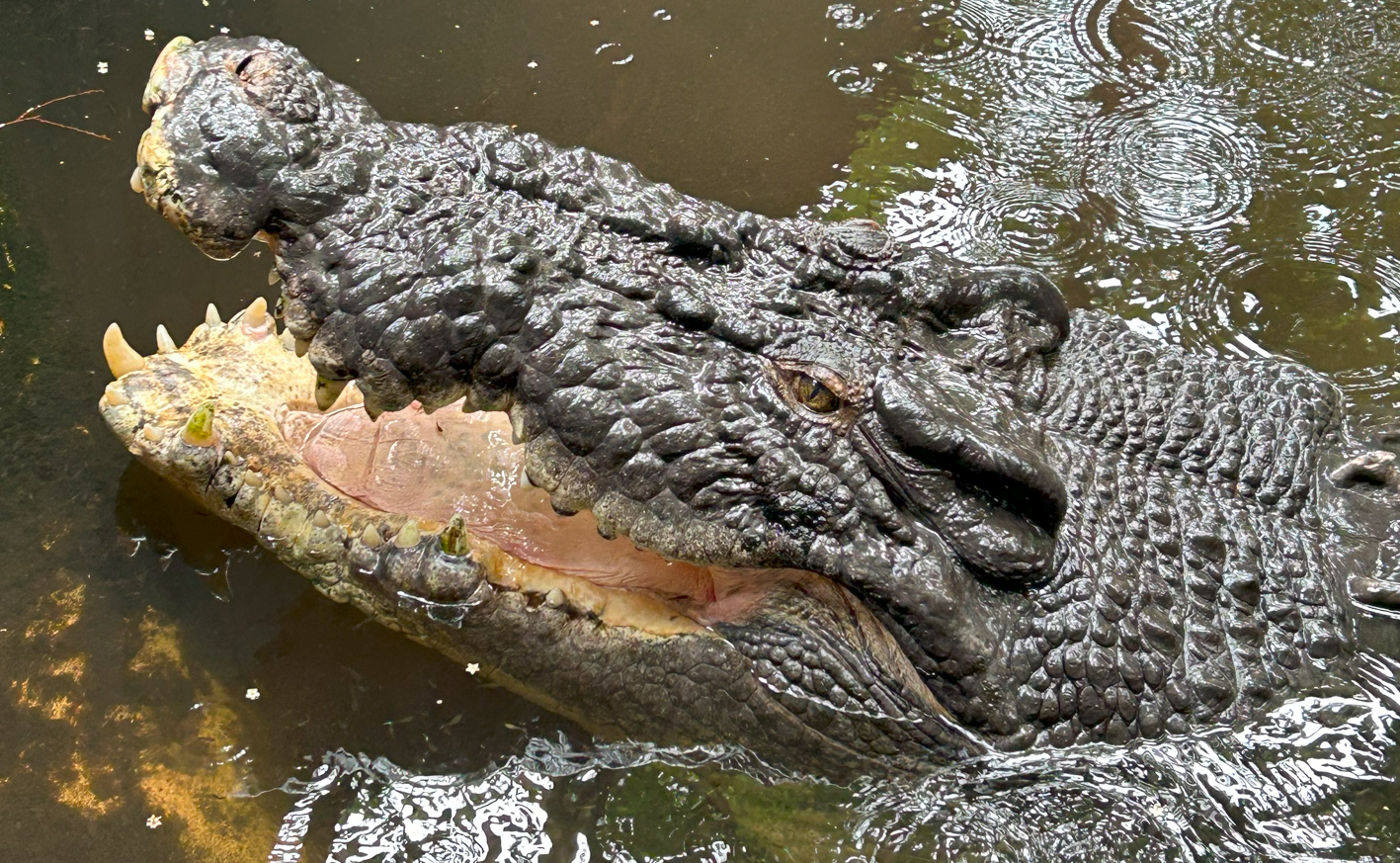
Cassius, the largest confirmed crocodile from 2013–2024

The largest confirmed saltwater crocodile on record drowned in a fishing net in Papua New Guinea, in 1979. Its dried skin plus head measured 6.2 m (20 ft 4 in) in length and it was estimated to have been 6.3 m (20 ft 8 in) when accounting for shrinkage and a missing tail tip. Projected from their skull lengths, multiple specimens from Singapore were estimated to belong in life to male crocodiles measuring more than 6 m (19 ft 8 in). A large Vietnamese saltwater crocodile was reliably estimated, based on its skull after its death, at 6.3 to 6.8 m (20 ft 8 in – 22 ft 4 in). However, according to evidence in the form of skulls coming from some of the largest crocodiles ever shot, the maximum possible size attained by the largest members of this species is considered to be 7 m (23 ft 0 in). A governmental study from Australia accepts that the very largest members of the species are likely to measure 6 to 7 m (19 ft 8 in – 23 ft 0 in) in length and weigh 900 to 1,500 kg (2,000 to 3,300 lb). Furthermore, a research paper on the morphology and physiology of crocodilians by the same organisation estimates that saltwater crocodiles reaching sizes of 7 m (23 ft 0 in) would weigh around 2,000 kg (4,400 lb). Due to the extreme size and highly aggressive nature of the species, weight in larger specimens is frequently poorly documented. A 5.1-metre (16 ft 9 in) long individual named "Sweetheart" was found to have weighed 780 kg (1,720 lb). Another large crocodile named "Gomek", measuring 5.42 m (17 ft 9 in) in length weighed around 860 kg (1,900 lb). In 1992, a notorious man-eater, named "Bujang Senang" was killed in Sarawak, Malaysia. It measured 5.7 m (18 ft 8 in) in length and weighed more than 900 kg (2,000 lb). A saltwater–siamese hybrid named "Yai" (Thai: ใหญ่, meaning big; born 10 June 1972) at the Samutprakarn Crocodile Farm and Zoo, Thailand was claimed to be the largest crocodile ever held in captivity. It measured 6 m (19 ft 8 in) in length and weighed approximately 1,118 kg (2,465 lb). In 1962, a large male saltwater crocodile was shot in Adelaide River, Northern Territory. It was recorded to be 6.1 m (20 ft 0 in) long and weighed 1,097 kg (2,418 lb). A large male in the Philippines, named Lolong, was one of the largest saltwater crocodiles ever caught and placed in captivity. He was 6.17 m (20 ft 3 in) long and weighed 1,075 kg (2,370 lb). Following his death in 2013, the largest living crocodile in captivity was "Cassius", who was kept at Marineland Crocodile Park, a zoo located at Green Island, Queensland, Australia. He measured 5.48 m (18 ft 0 in) in length and weighed approximately 1,300 kg (2,870 lb) before his death in November 2024.

==== Female size ====
Adult females typically measure from 2.7 to 3.1 m (8 ft 10 in to 10 ft 2 in) in total length and weigh 76 to 103 kg (168 to 227 lb). Large mature females reach 3.4 m (11 ft 2 in) and weigh up to 120 to 200 kg (260 to 440 lb). The largest female on record measured about 4.3 m (14 ft 1 in) in total length. Female are thus similar in size to other species of large crocodiles and average slightly smaller than females of some other species, like the Nile crocodile. The saltwater crocodile has the greatest size sexual dimorphism, by far, of any extant crocodilian, as males average about 4 to 5 times as massive as adult females and can sometimes measure twice her total length. The reason for the male skewed dimorphism in this species is not definitively known but might be correlated with sex-specific territoriality and the need for adult male saltwater crocodiles to monopolise large stretches of habitat. Due to the extreme sexual dimorphism of the species as contrasted with the more modest-sized dimorphism of other species, the average length of the species is only slightly more than some other extant crocodilians at 3.8–4 m (12 ft 6 in – 13 ft 1 in).

==== Reported sizes ====
Date	Location	Reported Length	Reported Weight	Reported Girth	Reported Skull Length	Scientifically Analyzed Length	Comments
1840	Bay of Bengal	1,005.84 cm (396.00 in)	2,721.55 kg (6,000.0 lb)	396.24 cm (156.00 in)	927 mm (36.5 in)	591.312 cm (232.800 in)	Skull saved, but was later shown to be measured incorrectly by calculating from snout to posterior edge of lower jaw, per GA Greer. Actual skull length was 655mm.
1823	Luzon, Philippines	822.96 cm (324.00 in)	Not listed	335.28 cm (132.00 in)	674 mm (26.5 in)	609.6 cm (240.0 in)	Skull preserved and measured by Thomas Barbour, who determined original length was taken along the curve of the belly.
July 1957	Carpenteria, Australia	860 cm (340 in)	Not listed	Not listed	Not listed	Not listed	Killed by Krystyna Pawlowski while defending her three-year-old daughter
1926–1932	North Borneo	1,005.84 cm (396.00 in)	Not listed	Not listed	Not listed	Not listed	Sighted by James R Montgomery sleeping on a river bank and was considered a legend by the Seluke people said to be over 200 years old.

== Distribution and habitat ==
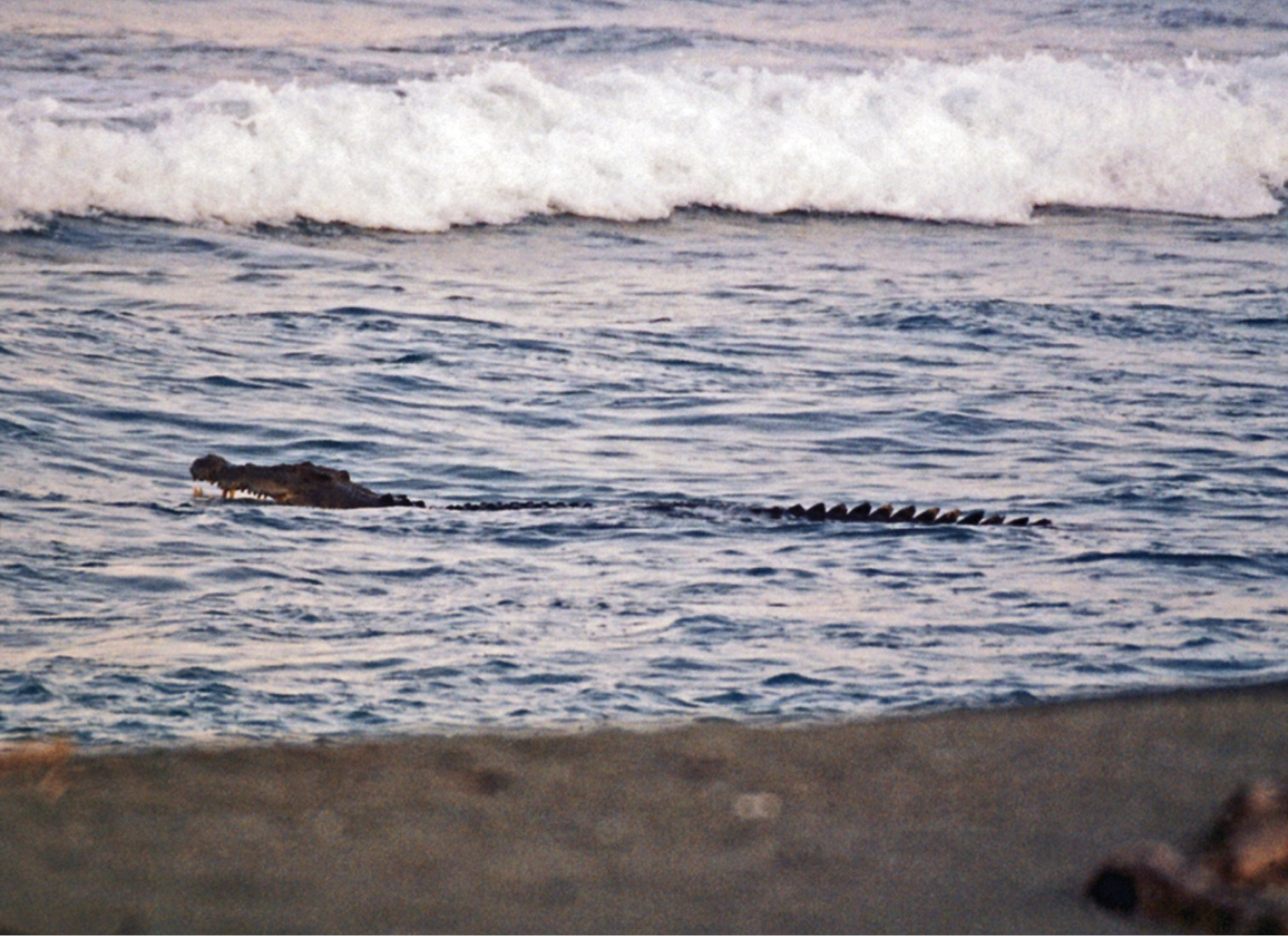
A saltwater crocodile off Maconacon, Isabela, northern Philippines

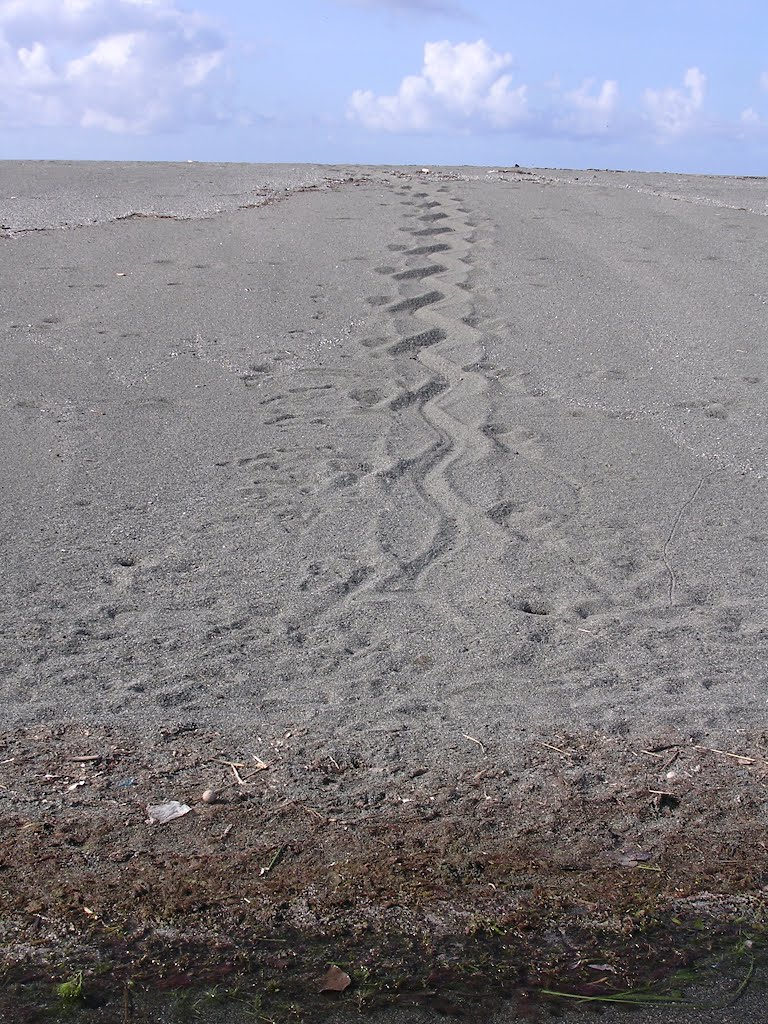
Saltwater crocodile tracks in East Timor

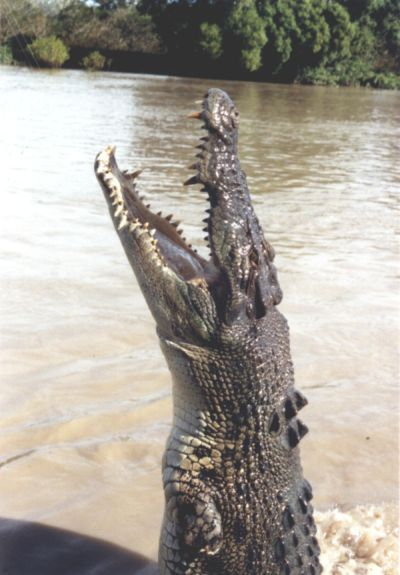
Saltwater crocodile jumping up at Adelaide River

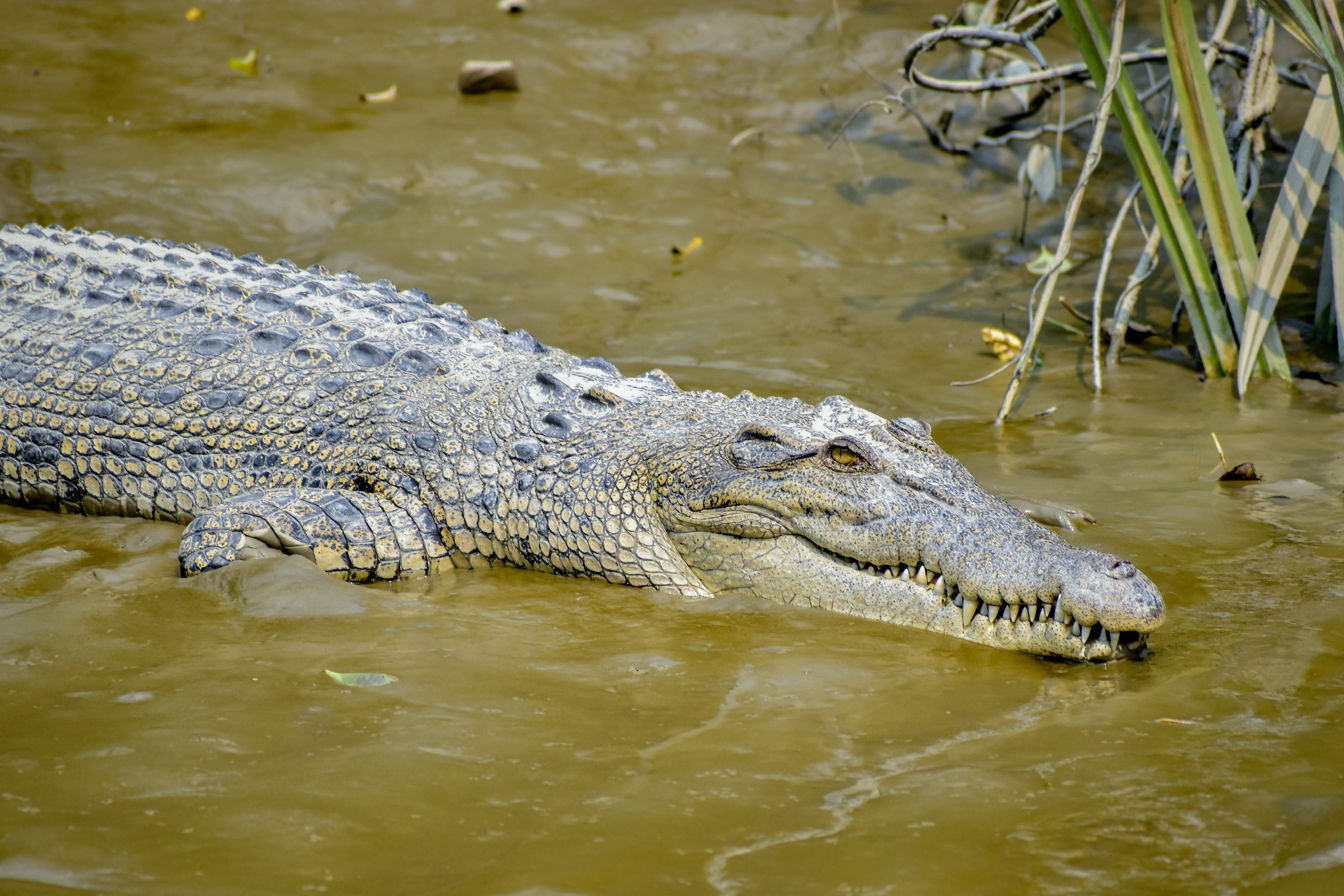
Basking on a river bank in the Sundarbans

The saltwater crocodile inhabits coastal brackish mangrove swamps, river deltas and freshwater rivers from India's east coast, Sri Lanka and Bangladesh to Myanmar, Malaysia, Brunei, Indonesia, Philippines, Timor Leste, Palau, Solomon Islands, Singapore, Papua New Guinea, Vanuatu and Australia's north coast. The southernmost population in India lives in Odisha's Bhitarkanika Wildlife Sanctuary; in northern Odisha, it has not been recorded since the 1930s. It occurs along the Andaman and Nicobar Islands coasts and in the Sundarbans. In Sri Lanka, it occurs foremost in western and southern parts of the country.

In Myanmar, it inhabits the Ayeyarwady Delta. In southern Thailand, it was recorded in Phang Nga Province. In Singapore, it inhabits the Sungei Buloh Wetland Reserve and marshes near Kranji and Mandai. It is locally extinct in Cambodia, China, Seychelles, Thailand and Vietnam.

In China, it may have once inhabited coastal areas from Fujian province in the north to the border of Vietnam. References to crocodile attacks on humans and livestock during the Han and Song dynasties indicate that until the 18th century, it may have occurred in lower Pearl River and Macau, Han River, Min River, portions of coastal Guangxi province and Hainan Island.

Three historical records of saltwater crocodiles being found in Japanese coastal waters exist; an individual was found off the coast of Iwo Jima in 1744, another was found off Amami Ōshima in 1800, and finally, a third individual was caught by fishermen in Toyama Bay in 1932. All other occurrences of the species being present within Japanese territory are from World War II, and were found in areas that were formerly controlled by the Empire of Japan.

In Malaysia, it was recorded in Klias, Segama and Kinabatangan Rivers in Sabah. In Sarawak, it was recorded by a camera trap in Kuching Wetlands National Park. In the Lesser Sunda Islands, it is present along the coasts of Sumba, Lembata Island, Flores, Menipo, Rote Island, and Timor. Its status along Alor Island is unknown, where one individual was captured in the 2010s. In the Maluku Islands, it is present around the Kai Islands, the Aru Islands, and many other islands in the region, including the Torres Strait Islands. In Papua New Guinea, it is common within the coastal reaches of every river system, such as the Fly River and in the Bismarck Archipelago. In the Philippines, it occurs in a few coastal sites like eastern Luzon, Palawan, the Liguasan Marsh, and Agusan River on Mindanao.

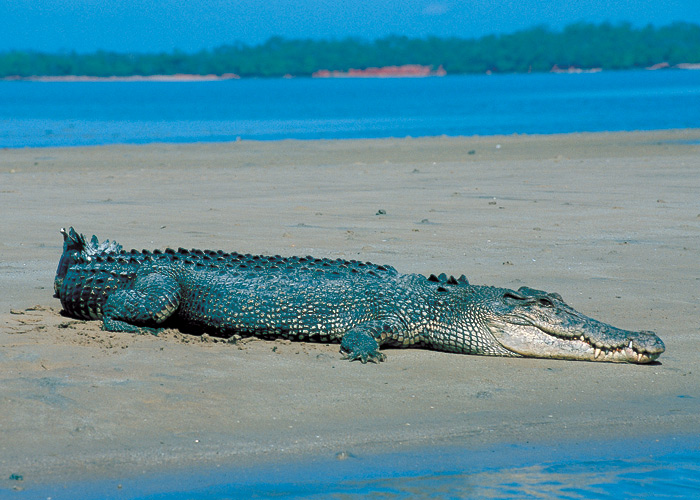
On a beach in Darwin, Northern Territory, Australia

In northern Australia, the saltwater crocodile is thriving, particularly in the multiple river systems near Darwin such as the Adelaide, Mary, and Daly Rivers, along with their adjacent billabongs and estuaries. The saltwater crocodile population in Australia is estimated at 100,000 to 200,000 adults. Its range extends from Broome, Western Australia through the entire Northern Territory coast all the way south to Gladstone, Queensland. The Alligator Rivers in the Arnhem Land region are misnamed due to the resemblance of the saltwater crocodile to alligators as compared to freshwater crocodiles, which also inhabit the Northern Territory.

The Seychelles historically represented the westernmost saltwater crocodile population, being roughly 3,000 km from the nearest population in the Indian Ocean. They were extirpated from the region roughly 200 years ago.

Because of its ability to swim long distances at sea, individual saltwater crocodiles appeared occasionally in areas far away from their general range, up to Fiji. Saltwater crocodiles generally spend the tropical wet season in freshwater swamps and rivers, moving downstream to estuaries in the dry season. Crocodiles compete fiercely with each other for territory, with dominant males in particular occupying the most eligible stretches of freshwater creeks and streams. Junior crocodiles are thus forced into marginal river systems and sometimes into the ocean. This explains the large distribution of the species, as well as its being found in odd places on occasion such as the Sea of Japan. Like all crocodiles, they can survive for prolonged periods in only warm temperatures, and crocodiles seasonally vacate parts of Australia if cold spells hit.

== Behaviour and ecology ==
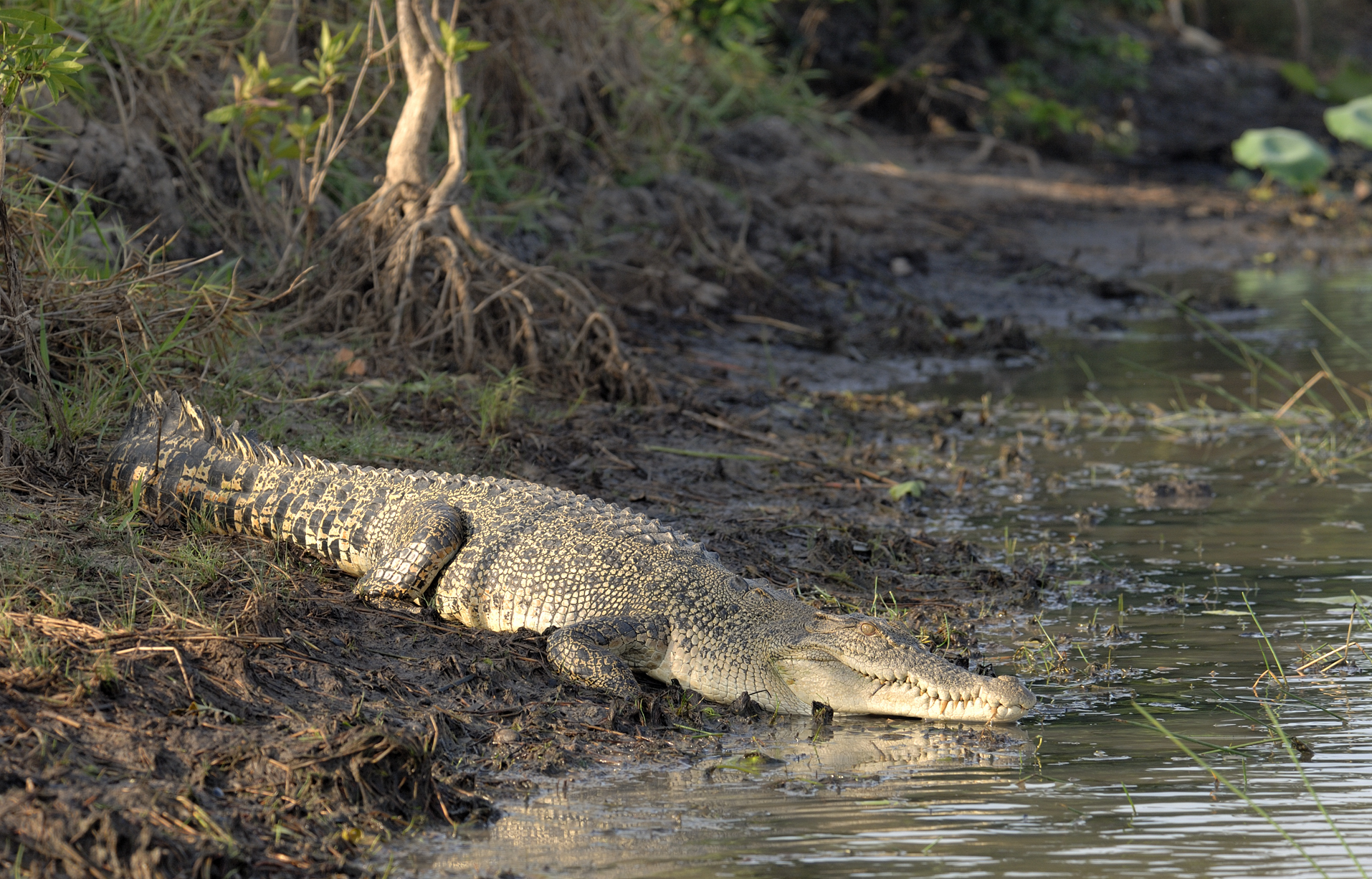
Saltwater crocodile sunning itself

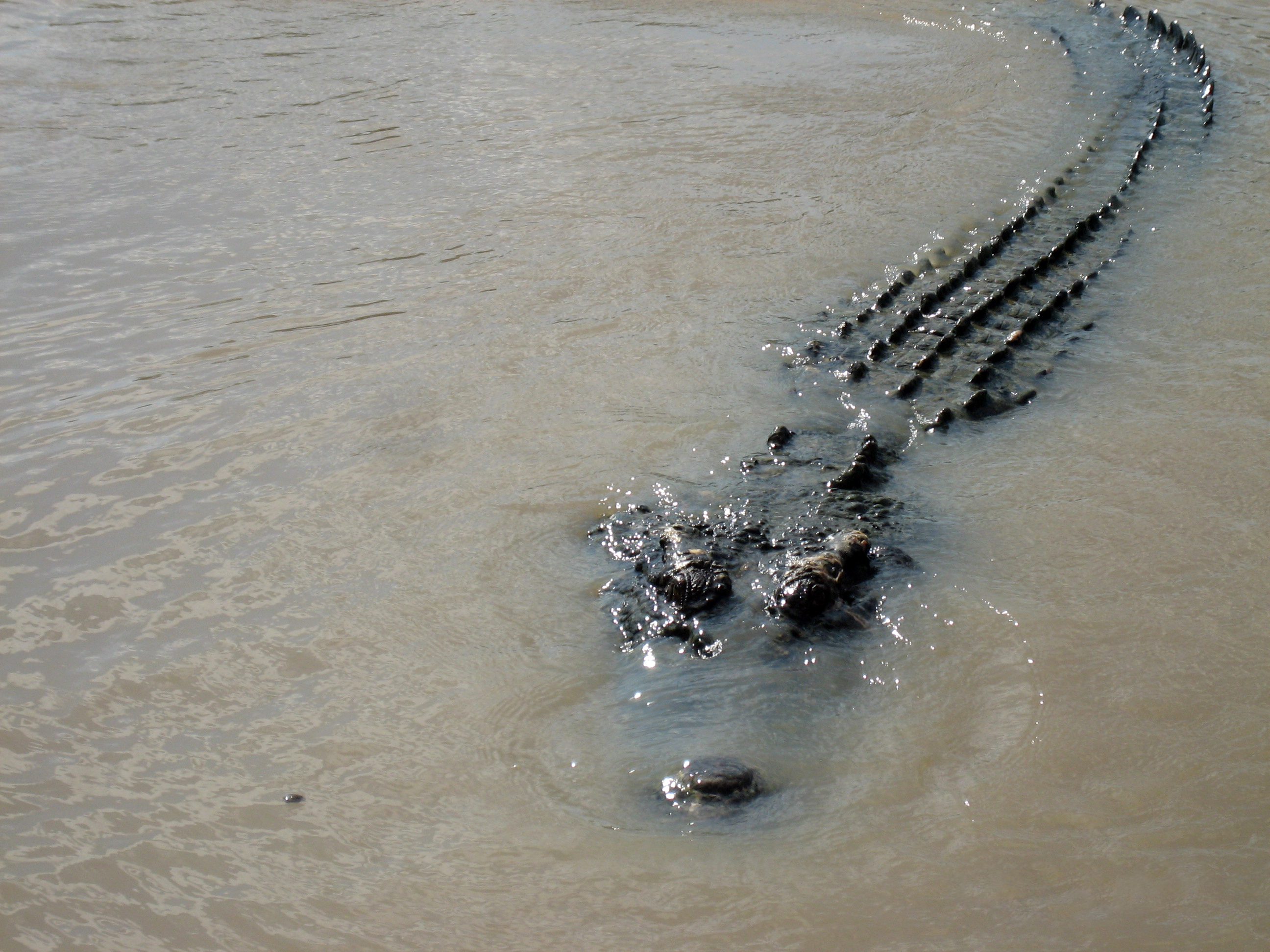
An adult saltwater crocodile swimming through a swamp

The primary behaviour to distinguish the saltwater crocodile from other crocodiles is its tendency to occupy salt water. Though other crocodiles also have salt glands that enable them to survive in saltwater, a trait that alligators do not possess, most other species do not venture out to sea except during extreme conditions.

Saltwater crocodiles use ocean currents to travel long distances. In Australia, 20 crocodiles were tagged with satellite transmitters; 8 of them ventured out into open ocean, and one of them traveled 590 km (370 mi) along the coast in 25 days from the North Kennedy River on the eastern coast of Far North Queensland, around Cape York Peninsula, to the west coast in the Gulf of Carpentaria. Another individual swam 411 km (255 mi) in 20 days. Without having to move around much, sometimes simply by floating, the current-riding behaviour allows for the conservation of energy. They interrupted their movements and resided in sheltered bays for a few days until the current changed direction. Sometimes, they also swam up and down river systems. Generally very lethargic, a trait that helps it survive months at a time without food, the saltwater crocodile will usually loiter in the water or bask in the sun during much of the day, preferring to hunt at night. A study of seasonal saltwater crocodile behaviour in Australia indicated that they are more active and more likely to spend time in the water during the Australian summer; conversely, they are less active and spend relatively more time basking in the sun during the winter. Saltwater crocodiles, however, are among the most active of all crocodilians, spending more time cruising and active, especially in water. They are much less terrestrial than most species of crocodiles, spending less time on land except for basking. At times, they tend to spend weeks at sea in search of land and in some cases, barnacles have been observed growing on crocodile scales, indicative of the long periods they spend at sea.

Saltwater crocodiles are able to stay fully submerged underwater for long periods of time. To extend an aerobic dive, they can reduce their heart rate and oxygen consumption. Voluntary dives for up to two hours have been reported and even much longer dives considered to be possible for large individuals when their metabolic rate is reduced. Diving depth of C. porosus is poorly studied, but they have been recorded at depths of 15 m (49 ft) and can probably go much deeper.

While crocodilian brains are much smaller than those of mammals (as low as 0.05% of body weight in the saltwater crocodile), saltwater crocodiles are capable of learning difficult tasks with very little conditioning, learning to track the migratory route of their prey as the seasons change, and may possess a deeper communication ability than currently accepted. While saltwater crocodiles are the least social and most aggressive crocodilians, it still showed varies interspecific variations of gregariousness. Their social systems are dynamic, influenced by the time of year, as well as the sex and maturity of the individuals. Individuals have been known to maintain specific associations for up to five years.

=== Hunting and diet ===
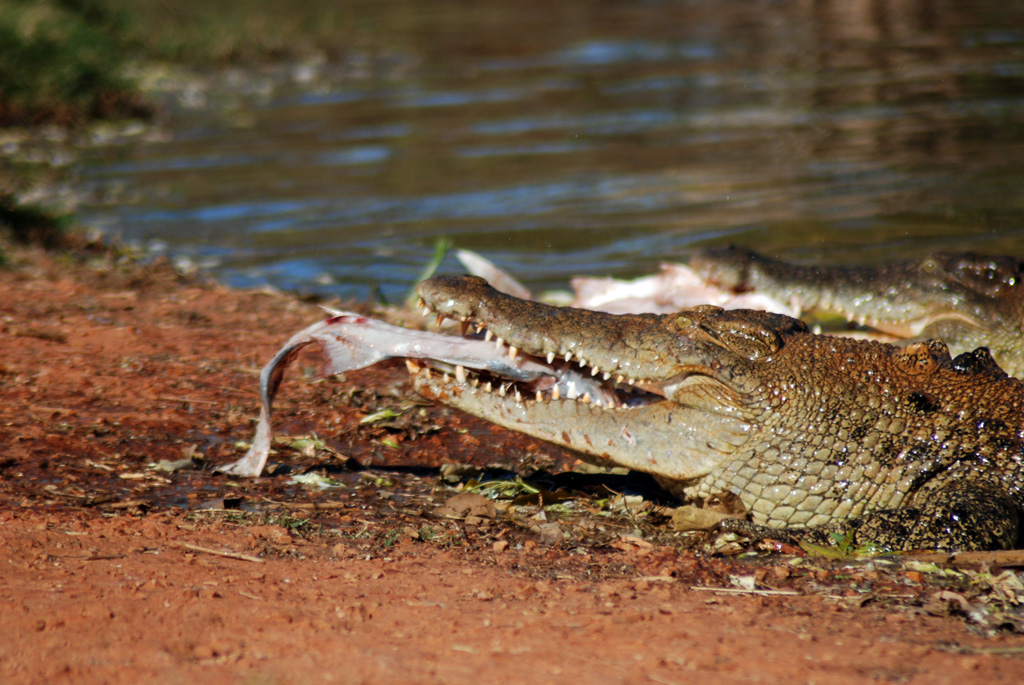
Feeding young adult in captivity, Western Australia

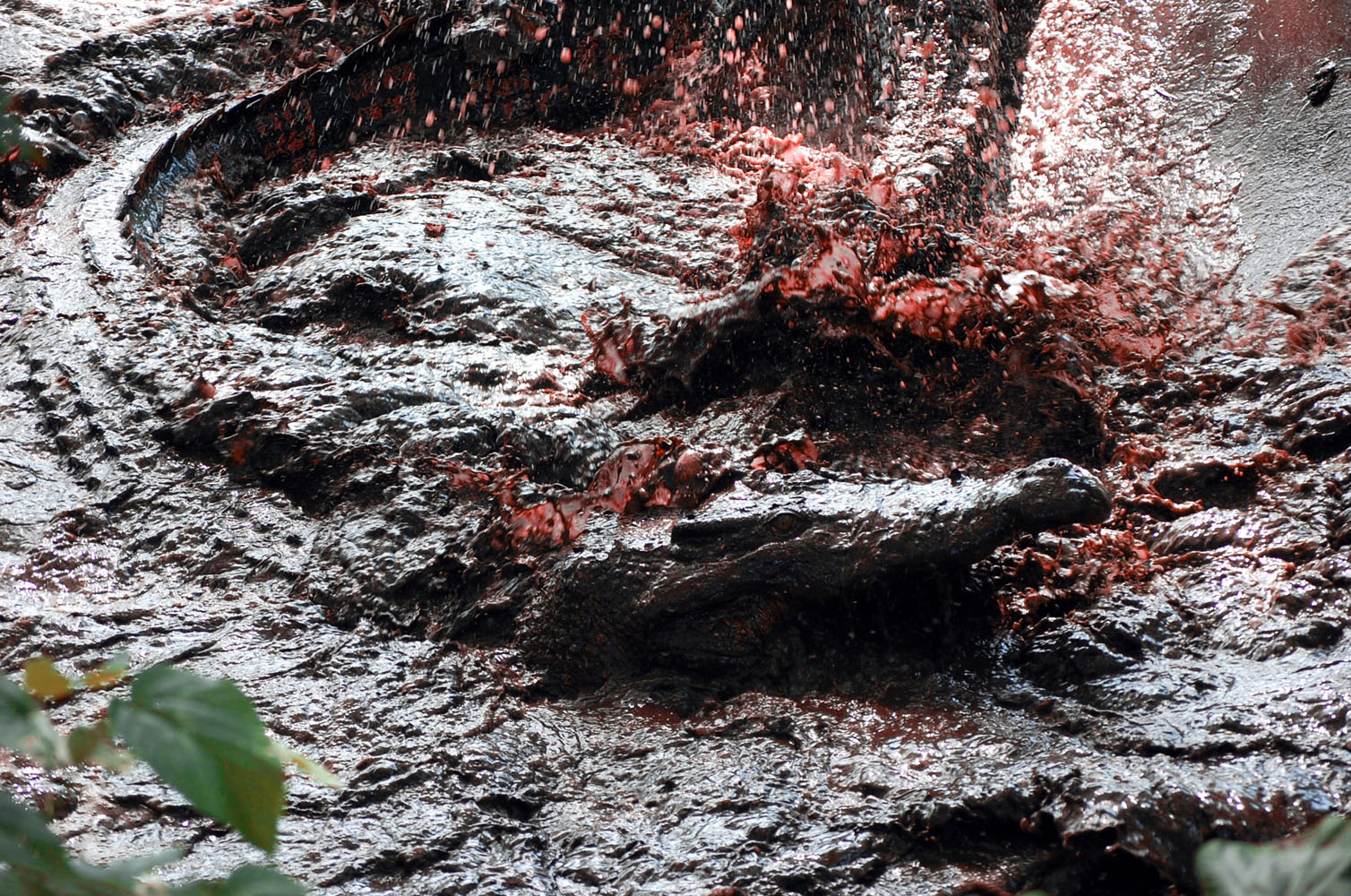
Saltwater crocodile tears apart a pig carcass for consumption.

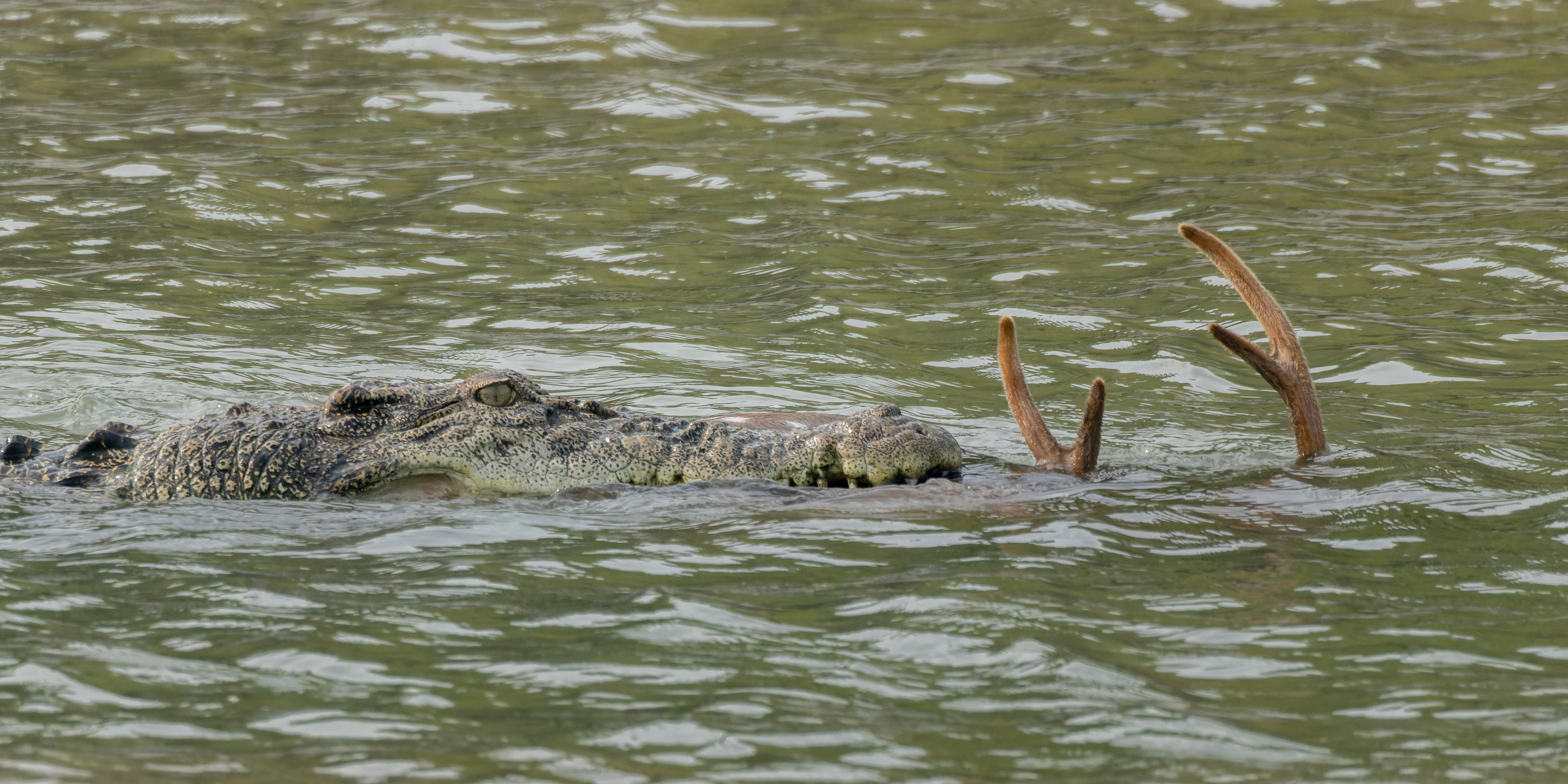
Saltwater crocodile (Crocodylus porosus) with food (Chital) in Sundarbans National Park, West Bengal, India.

Like most species in the crocodilian family, saltwater crocodiles are not fastidious in their choice of food, and readily vary their prey selection according to availability. Nor are they voracious, as they are able to survive on relatively little food for a prolonged period. Because of their size and distribution, saltwater crocodiles hunt the broadest range of prey species of any modern crocodilian. The diet of hatchling, juvenile, and subadult saltwater crocodiles has been subject to extensively greater scientific study than that of fully-grown crocodiles, in large part due to the aggression, territoriality, and size of adults that make them difficult for biologists to handle without significant risk to safety, for both humans and the crocodiles themselves. The main method used for capturing adult saltwater crocodiles is a huge pole with large hooks, meant for shark capture, that restrict the crocodile's jaws, but these can cause damage to their snouts; and even this is unproven to allow successful capture for crocodiles in excess of 4 m (13 ft 1 in). While for example 20th century biological studies rigorously cataloged the stomach contents of "sacrificed" adult Nile crocodiles in Africa, few such studies were done on behalf of saltwater crocodiles despite the plethora that were slaughtered due to the leather trade during that time period. Therefore, the diet of adults is more likely to be based on reliable eye-witness accounts. Hatchlings are restricted to feeding on smaller animals, such as small fish, frogs, insects and small aquatic invertebrates. In addition to these prey, juveniles also take a variety of freshwater and saltwater fish, various amphibians, crustaceans, molluscs, such as large gastropods and cephalopods, birds, small to medium-sized mammals, and other reptiles, such as snakes and lizards. When crocodiles obtain a length of more than 1.2 m (3 ft 11 in), the significance of small invertebrate prey fades in favour of small vertebrates, including fish and smaller mammals and birds. Among crustacean prey, large mud crabs of the genus Scylla are frequently consumed, especially in mangrove habitats. Ground-living birds, such as the emu and different kinds of water birds, especially the magpie goose, are the most commonly preyed upon birds, due to the increased chance of encounter. Even swift-flying birds and bats may be snatched if close to the surface of water, as well as wading birds while these are patrolling the shore looking for food, even down to the size of a common sandpiper. Mammalian prey of juveniles and subadults are usually as large as the smaller species of ungulates, such as the greater mouse-deer (Tragulus napu) and Indian hog deer (Axis porcinus). Prey species recorded include primate species such as crab-eating macaques, proboscis monkeys, and gibbons. It preys on agile wallabies, golden jackals, viverrids, turtles, flying foxes, hares, rodents, badgers, otters, chevrotains and pangolins. A rare incidence of an adult 2.6 m (8 ft 6 in) long saltwater crocodile preying on an Indian porcupine was reported in Sri Lanka. Unlike fish, crabs and aquatic creatures, mammals and birds are usually found only sporadically in or next to water; so crocodiles seem to search for places where such prey may be concentrated, e.g. the water under a tree holding a flying fox colony, or spots where herds of water buffaloes feed, in order to capture small animals disturbed by the buffalo or (if a large adult crocodile is hunting) weaker members of the buffalo herd.

Studies have shown that, unlike freshwater crocodiles (which can easily die from eating poisonous toads), saltwater crocodiles are partially resistant to cane toad toxins and can consume them, but in only small quantities and not enough to provide effective natural control for this virulent introduced pest. Large crocodiles, even the oldest males, do not ignore small species, especially those without developed escape abilities, when the opportunity arises. On the other hand, sub-adult saltwater crocodiles weighing only 8.7 to 15.8 kg (19 to 35 lb) (and measuring 1.36 to 1.79 m (4 ft 6 in to 5 ft 10 in)) have been recorded killing and eating goats weighing 50 to 92% of their own body mass in Orissa, India, and so are capable of attacking large prey from an early age. It was found that the diet of specimens in juvenile to subadult range, since they feed on any animals up to their own size practically no matter how small, was more diverse than that of adults, which often ignored all prey below a certain size limit.

Large animals taken by adult saltwater crocodiles include sambar deer, wild boar, Malayan tapirs, kangaroos, feral pigs, humans, orangutans, dingos, tigers, and large bovines, such as banteng, water buffalo, and gaur. However, larger animals are taken only sporadically because only large males typically attack very large prey, and large ungulates and other sizeable wild mammals are only sparsely distributed in this species' range, outside of a few key areas such as the Sundarbans. Off-setting this, goats, water buffalo and wild boar/pigs have been introduced to many of the areas occupied by saltwater crocodiles and returned to feral states to varying degrees, and thus can amply support large crocodiles. In Australia, the saltwater crocodile's taste for feral pigs and buffalo was a key factor in their recovery for hunting pressures over the last fifty years according to studies published in 2022 by Dr. Marianna Campbell et al.,. Isotopes taken from the bones of crocodiles collected over five decades ago when crocodiles populations were low and comparisons to specimens from modern populations suggest that initially, Australian saltwater crocodiles subsisted on a more estuarine diet, and both hunting pressures by humans and a reduction in aquatic prey in places like the Top End resulted in a dietary switch to more terrestrial prey that allowed them to grow and recover more rapidly from population declines. Any type of livestock, such as chicken, sheep, pigs, horses and cattle, and domesticated animals/pets may be eaten if given the opportunity. As a seagoing species, the saltwater crocodile also preys on a variety of saltwater bony fish and other marine animals, including sea snakes, sea turtles, sea birds, dugongs, rays (including large sawfish), and small sharks. Most witnessed acts of predation on marine animals have occurred in coastal waters or within sight of land, with female sea turtles and their babies caught during mating season when the turtles are closer to shore, and bull sharks being the only largish shark with a strong propensity to patrol brackish and fresh waters. However, there is evidence that saltwater crocodiles do hunt while out in the open seas, based upon the remains of pelagic fishes that dwell only miles away from land being found in their stomachs.

The hunting methods utilised by saltwater crocodiles are indistinct from any other crocodilian, with the hunting crocodile submerging and quietly swimming over to the prey before pouncing upwards, striking suddenly. Unlike some other crocodilians, such as American alligators and even Nile crocodiles, they are not known to have hunted on dry land. Young saltwater crocodiles are capable of breaching their entire body into the air in a single upward motion while hunting prey that may be perched on low hanging branches. While hunting rhesus macaques, they have been seen to knock the monkeys off a bank by knocking them with their tail, forcing the macaque into water for easy consumption. However, whether tail use in hunting is intentional or just an accidental benefit is not definitely clear. As with other crocodilians, their sharp, peg-like teeth are well-suited to seize and tightly grip prey, but not to shear flesh. Small prey are simply swallowed whole, while larger animals are dragged into deep water and drowned or crushed. Large prey is then torn into manageable pieces by "death rolling", the spinning of the crocodile to twist off hunks of meat or by sudden jerks of the head. Occasionally, food items will be stored for later consumption once a crocodile eats its fill, although this can lead to scavenging by interlopers such as monitor lizards.

==== Bite ====
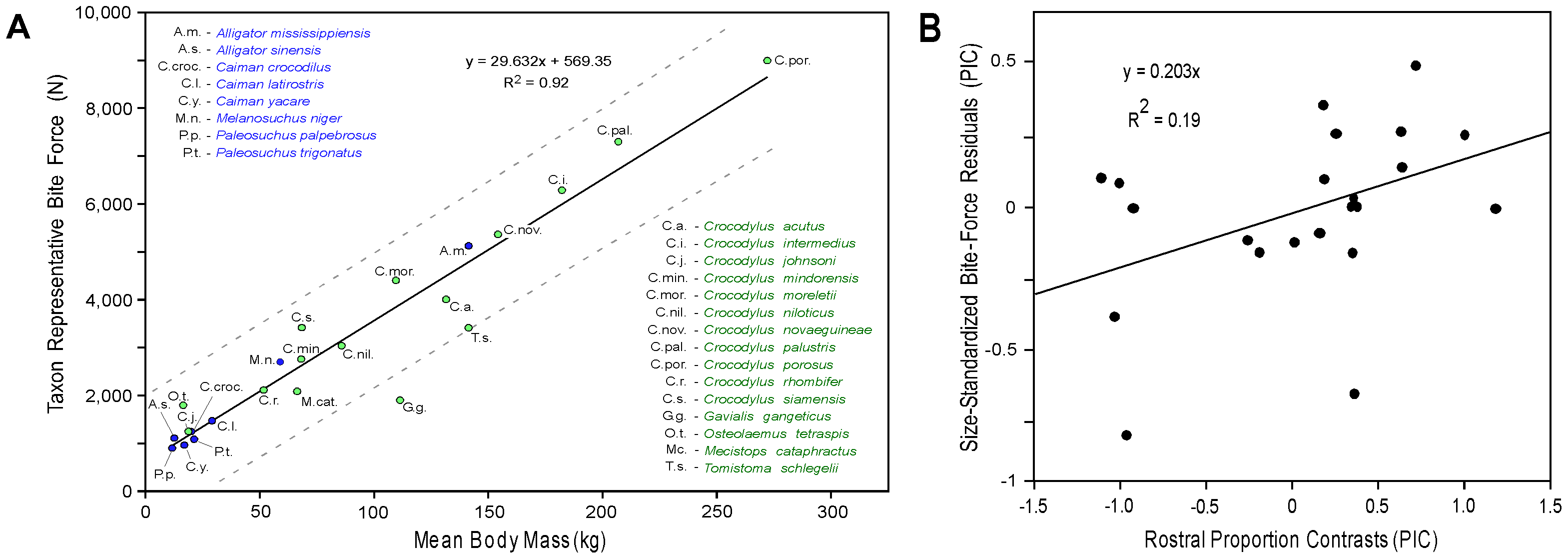
Regression of mean body mass and bite force of C. porosus

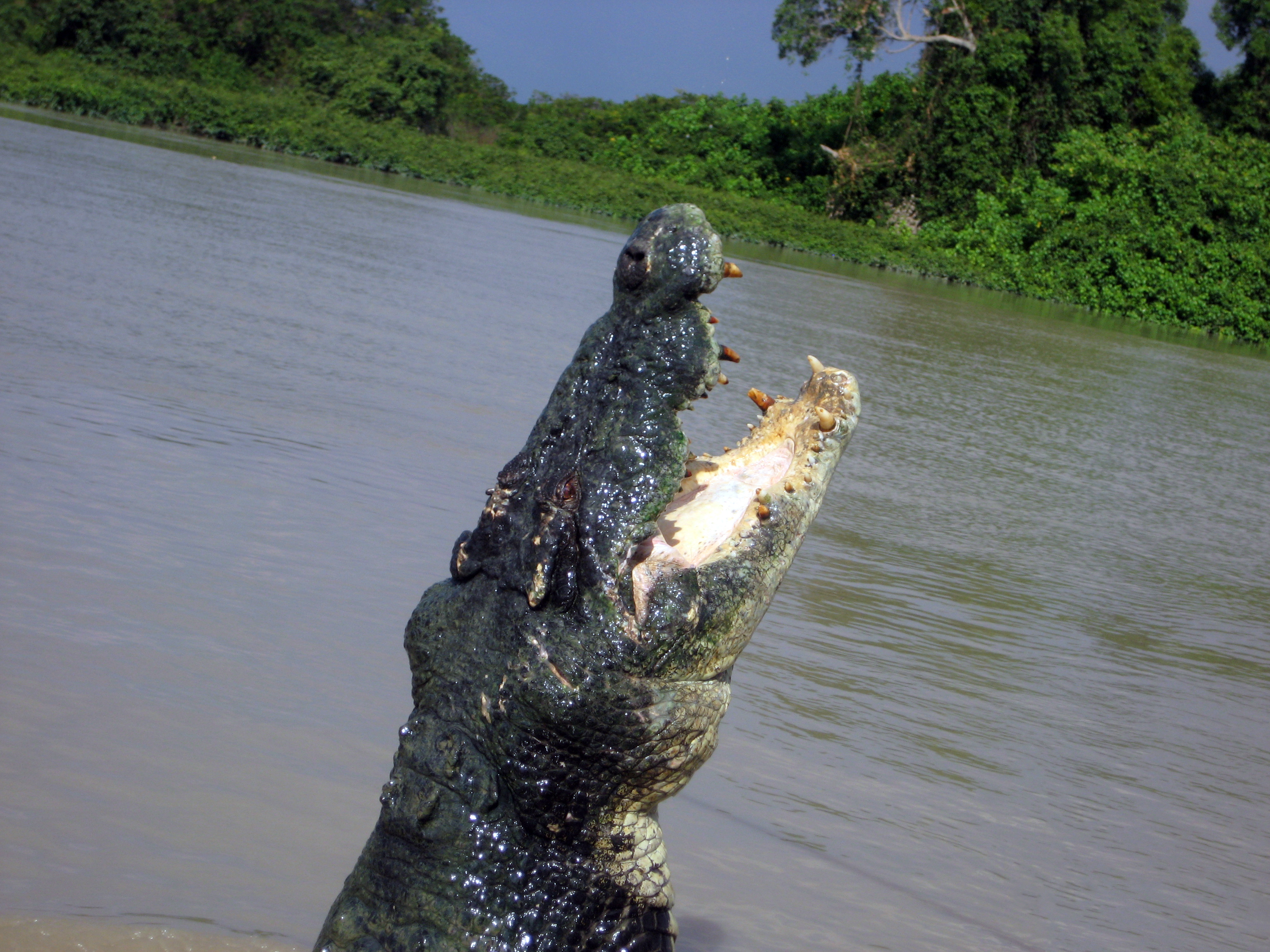
Saltwater crocodiles, even adults, can breach out of the water in upwards direction to capture food, although are most often seen to do so when coerced by bait, as seen here

Saltwater crocodiles have the strongest bite of any living animal. A 4.59 m-long (15 ft 1 in) 531 kg (1,171 lb) saltwater crocodile has been confirmed as having the highest bite force quotient ever recorded for an animal in a laboratory setting, with a value of 16,414 N (3,690 lbf) surpassing the previous record of 13,172 N or 2,961 lbf made by an American alligator (Alligator mississippiensis). Based on the regression of mean body mass and mean bite force, the bite forces of multiple crocodile species, 1,308 kg (2,884 lb) individuals were estimated at 27,531 to 34,424 N (6,189 to 7,739 lbf). The extraordinary bite of crocodilians is a result of their anatomy. The space for the jaw muscle in the skull is very large, which is easily visible from the outside as a bulge at each side. The nature of the muscle is extremely stiff, almost as hard as bone to the touch, such that it can appear to be a continuation of the skull. Another trait is that most of the muscle in a crocodile's jaw is arranged for clamping down. Despite the strong muscles to close the jaw, crocodiles have extremely small and weak muscles to open the jaw. The jaws of a crocodile can be securely shut with several layers of duct tape.

=== Reproduction ===
Males reach sexual maturity around 3.3 m (11 ft) at around 16 years of age, while females reach sexual maturity at 2.1 m (6 ft 11 in) and 12–14 years of age. Saltwater crocodiles mate in the wet season, when water levels are at their highest. In Australia, the male and female engage in courtship in September and October, and the female lays eggs between November and March. It is possible the rising temperatures of the wet season provoke reproductive behaviour in this species. While crocodilians generally nest every year, there have been several recorded cases of female saltwater crocodiles nesting only every other year and also records of a female attempting to produce two broods in a single wet season. The female selects the nesting site, and both parents will defend the nesting territory, which is typically a stretch of shore along tidal rivers or freshwater areas, especially swamps. Nests are often in a surprisingly exposed location, often in mud with little to no vegetation around, and thus limited protection from the sun and wind. The nest is a mound of mud and vegetation, usually measuring 175 cm (69 in) long and 53 cm (21 in) high, with an entrance averaging 160 cm (63 in) in diameter. Some nests in unlikely habitats have occurred, such as rocky rubble or in a damp low-grass field. The female crocodile usually scratches a layer of leaves and other debris around the nest entrance and this covering is reported to produce an "astonishing" amount of warmth for the eggs (coincidentally these nesting habits are similar to those of the birds known as megapodes that nest in upland areas of the same Australasian regions where saltwater crocodiles are found).

The female typically lays from 40 to 60 eggs, but some clutches have included up to 90. The eggs measure on average 8 by 5 cm (3.1 by 2.0 in) and weigh 113 g (4.0 oz) on average in Australia and 121 g (4.3 oz) in India. These are relatively small, as the average female saltwater crocodile weighs around five times as much as a freshwater crocodile, but lays eggs that are only about 20% larger in measurement and 40% heavier than those of the smaller species. The average weight of a new hatchling in Australia is reportedly 69.4 g (2.45 oz). Although the female guards the nest for 80 to 98 days (in extreme high and low cases from 75 to 106 days), the loss of eggs is often high due to flooding and occasionally to predation. As in all crocodilians, the sex of the hatchlings is determined by temperature. At 28–30 degrees all hatchlings will be female, at 30–32 degrees 86% of hatchlings are male, and at 33 or more degrees predominantly female (84%). In Australia, goannas (Varanus giganteus) commonly eat freshwater crocodile eggs (feeding on up to 95% of the clutch if discovered), but are relatively unlikely to eat saltwater crocodile eggs due to the vigilance of the imposing mother, with about 25% of the eggs being lost to goannas (less than half as many Nile crocodile eggs are estimated to be eaten by monitors in Africa). A majority of the loss of eggs of saltwater crocodiles occurs due to flooding of the nest hole.

As in most crocodilian species, the female saltwater crocodile exhibits a remarkable level of maternal care for a reptile. She excavates the nest in response to "yelping" calls from the hatchlings, and even gently rolls eggs in her mouth to assist hatching. The female will then carry the hatchlings to water in her mouth (as Nile crocodile and American alligator females have been observed doing when their eggs hatch) and remains with the young for several months. Despite her diligence, losses of baby crocodiles are heavy due to various predators and unrelated crocodiles of their own species. Only approximately 1% of the hatchlings will survive to adulthood. By crocodilian standards, saltwater crocodile hatchlings are exceptionally aggressive to one another and will often fight almost immediately after being transported to water by their mother. The young naturally start to disperse after around 8 months, and start to exhibit territorial behaviour at around 2.5 years old. They are the most territorial of extant crocodilians and, due to their aggressiveness to conspecifics, from the dispersed immature stage on, they are never seen in concentrations or loose groups as are most other crocodilians. However, even females will not reach proper sexual maturity for another 10 years. Saltwater crocodiles that survive to adulthood can attain a very long maximum life span, with an estimated life expectancy upwards of 70 years, and some individuals possibly exceed 100 years, although no such extreme ages have been verified for any crocodilian.

While adults have no natural predators, baby saltwater crocodiles may fall prey to monitor lizards (occasionally, but not commonly, the numerous goanna in Australia, and the Asian water monitor (Varanus salvator) further north), predatory fish (especially the barramundi (Lates calcarifer)), wild boars, greater bandicoot rats, various aquatic and raptorial birds (e.g. black-necked storks and black kites), water pythons, freshwater crocodiles, and many other predators (such as northern long-necked turtles, small Indian mongooses, grey mongooses, and ants of an unknown species). Pigs and cattle also occasionally inadvertently trample eggs and nests on occasion and degrade habitat quality where found in numbers.

Saltwater crocodiles go through numerous physiological changes as they mature. Pictured here is a hatchling age or baby crocodile.

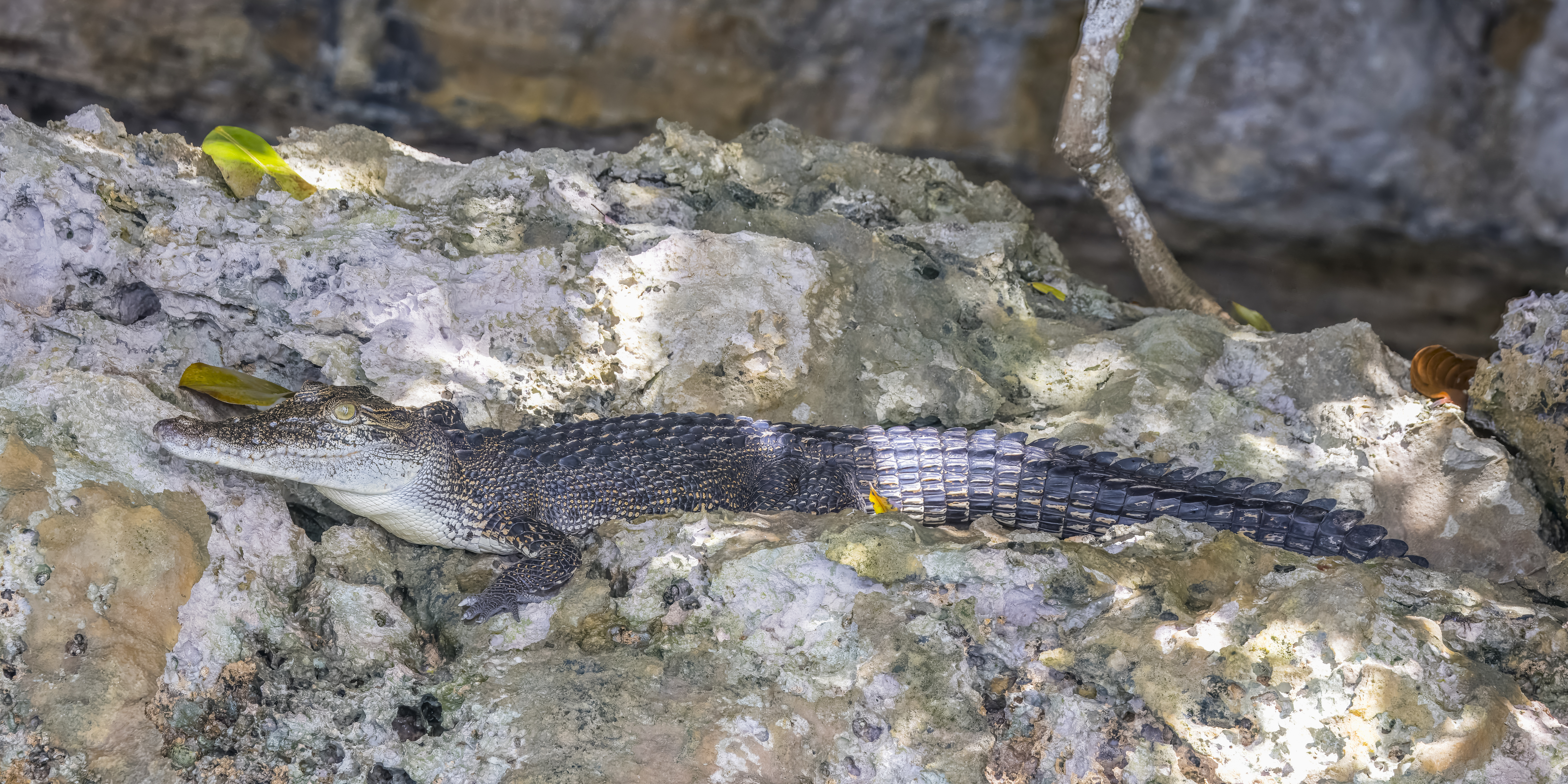
juvenile, RockIslands, Palau

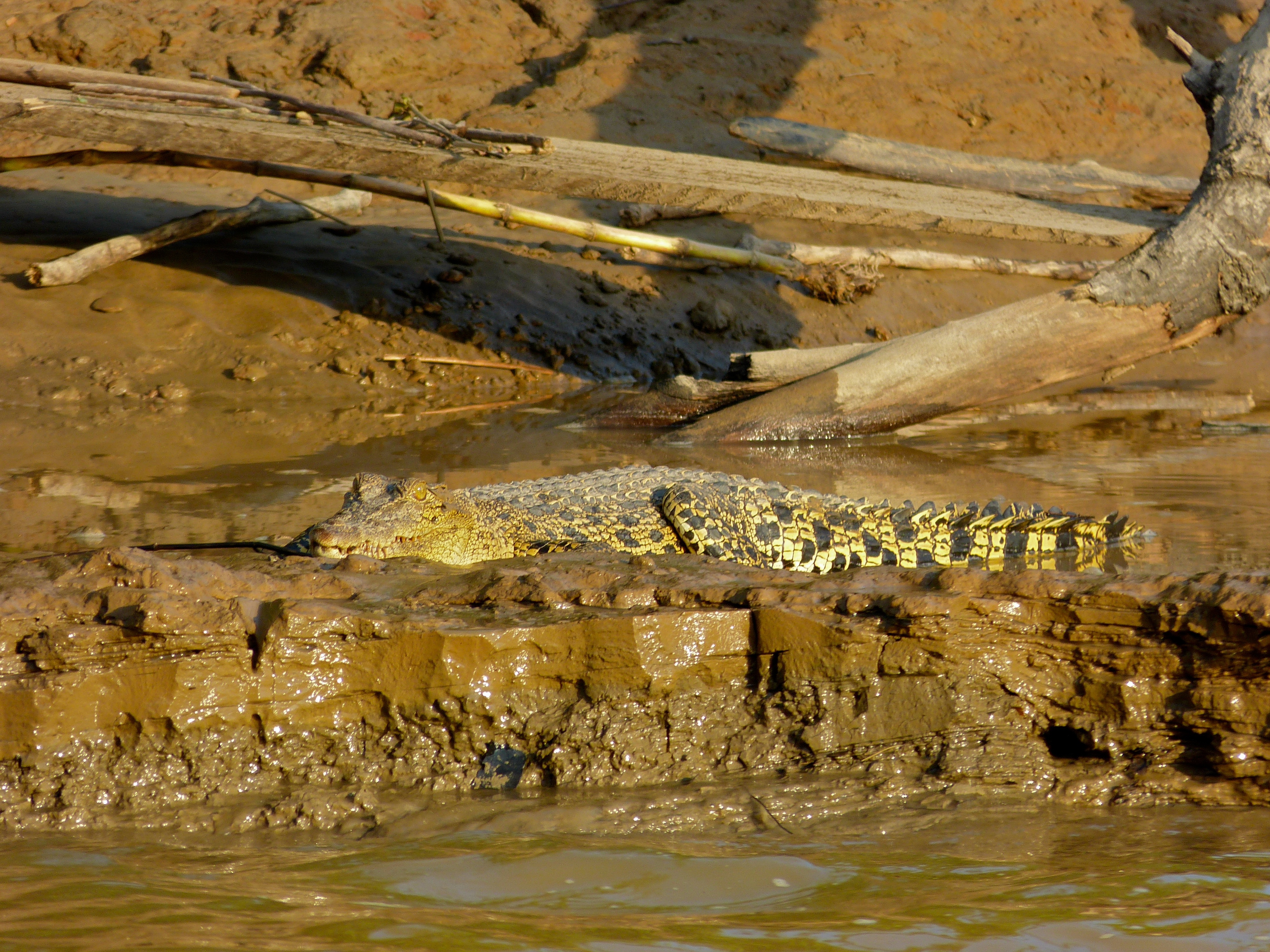
Seen here is a juvenile crocodile, which grows considerably in length over several years but is easily distinguished by slender build and size.

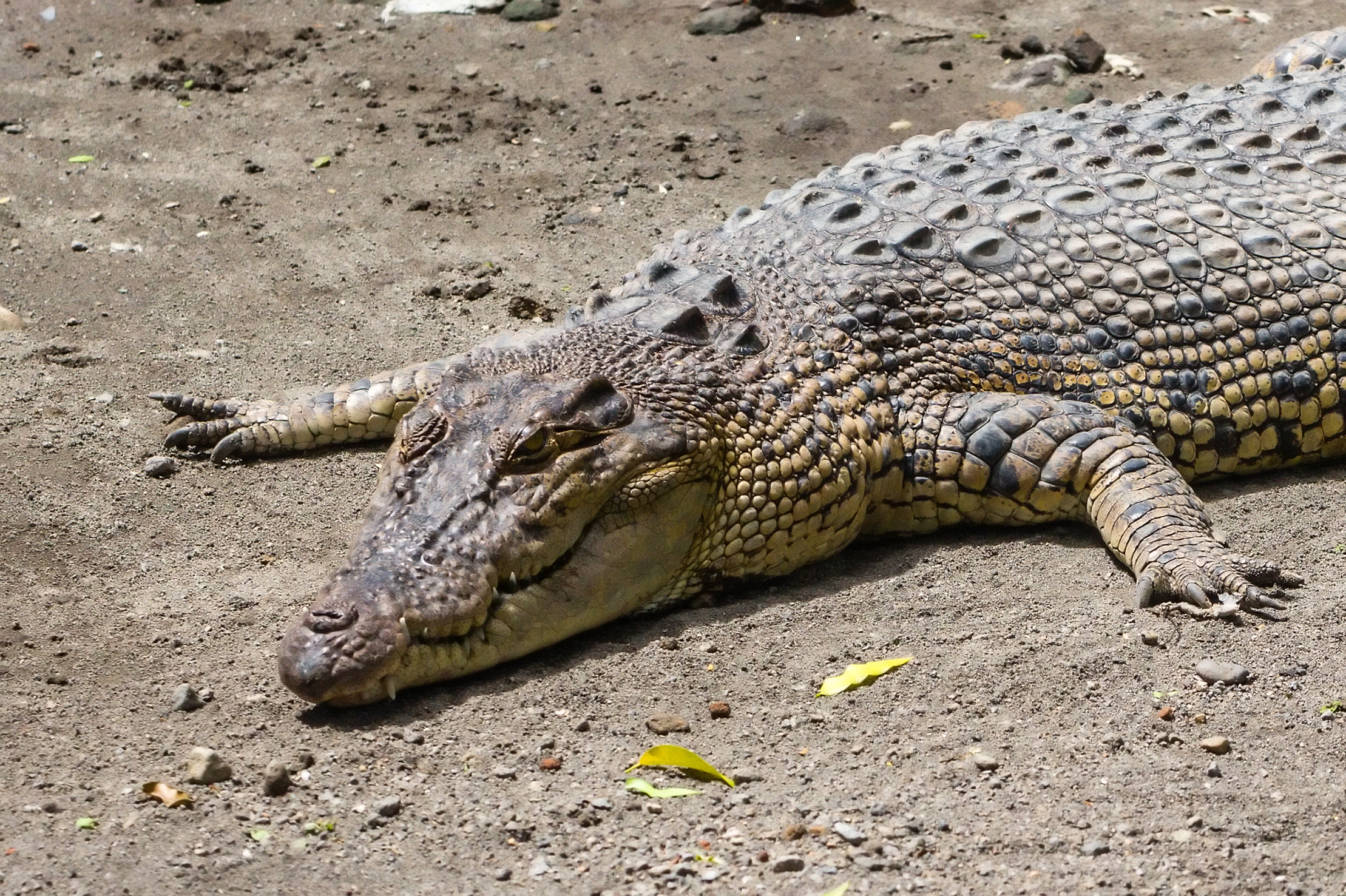
A saltwater crocodile in the subadult age range at Gembira Loka Zoo, similar but not as robust and relatively small-headed compared to adults.

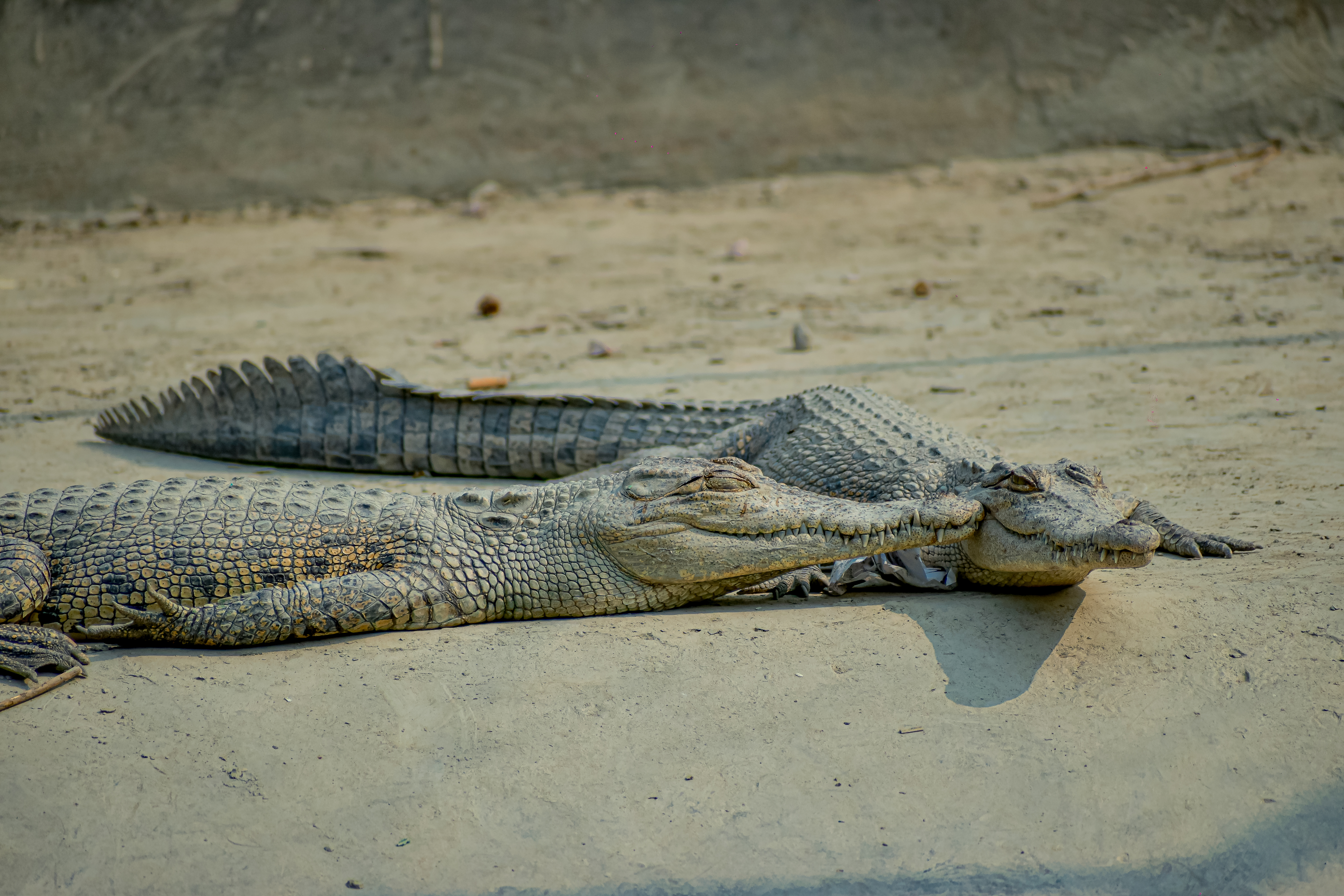
Juvenile salt water crocodiles at Karamjal Wildlife Breeding center, Bangladesh

== Conservation status ==
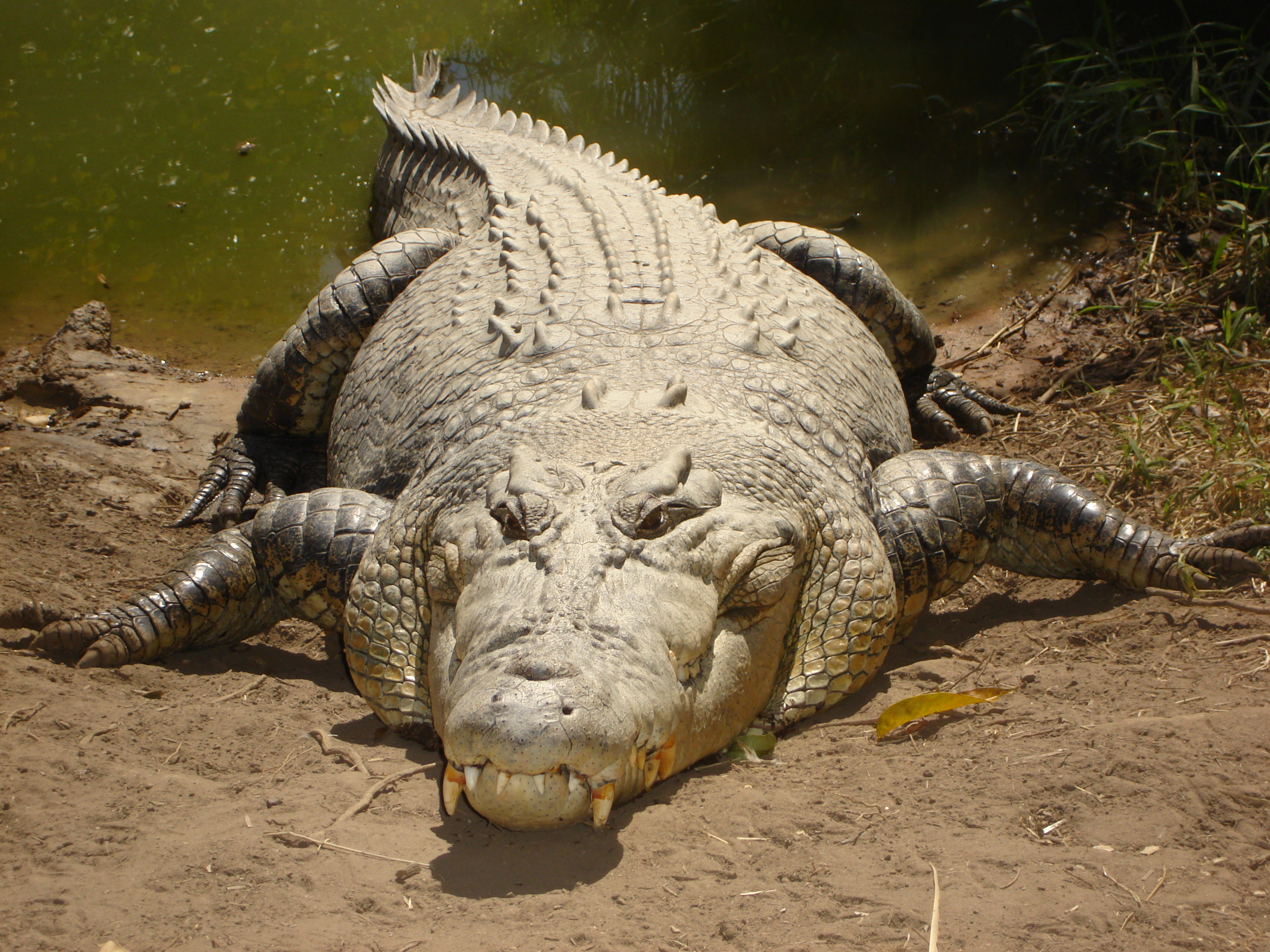
Saltwater crocodile

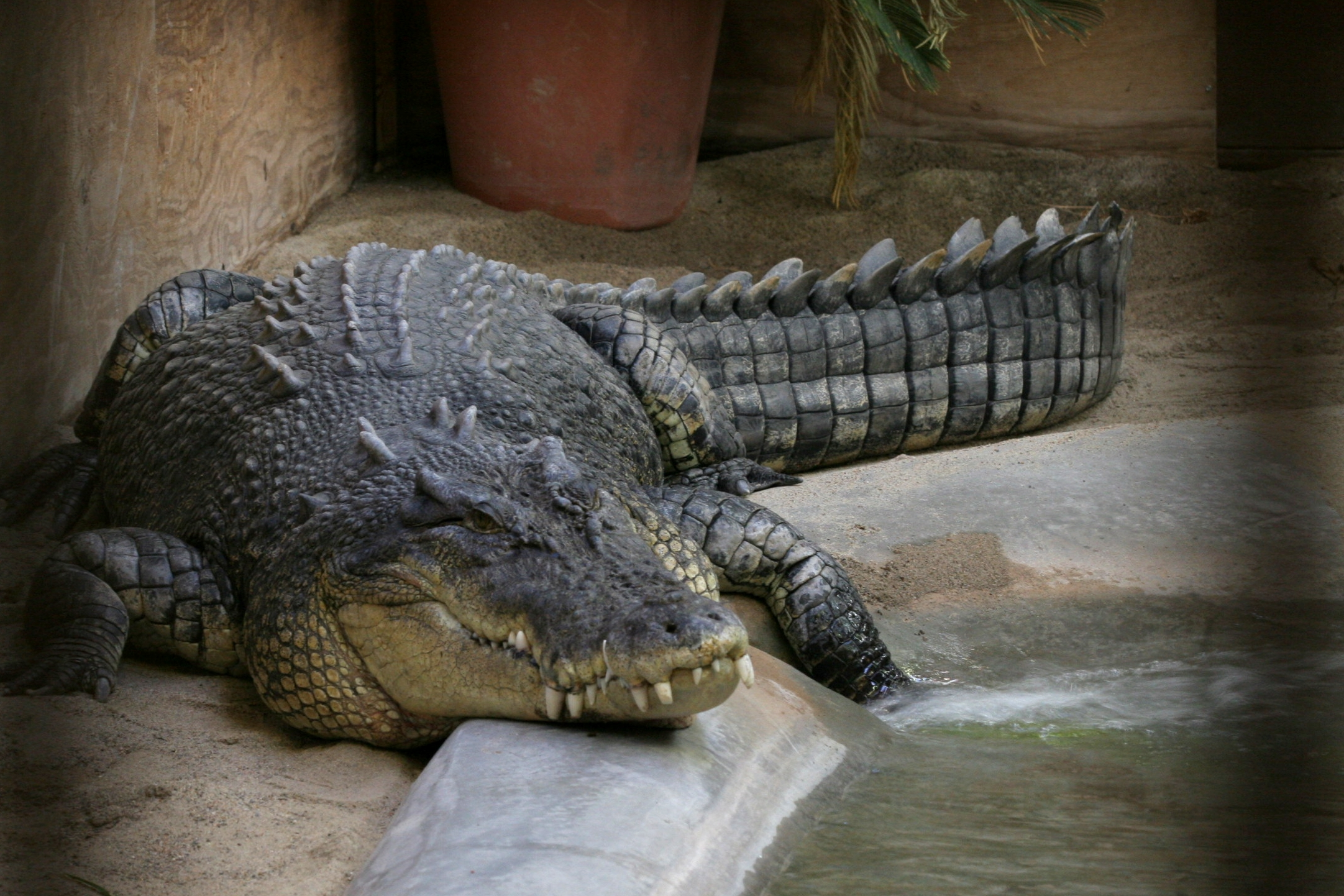
Large saltwater crocodile in ABQ BioPark Zoo

The species is considered of minimal concern for extinction but is protected from the effects of international trade under the Convention on International Trade in Endangered Species (CITES) as follows:

- Appendix I (prohibiting all commercial trade in the species or its parts/derivatives): All wild populations except for those of Australia, Indonesia and Papua New Guinea;
- Appendix II (commercial trade allowed with export permit; import permits may or may not be required depending on the laws of the importing country): Australia, Indonesia and Papua New Guinea wild populations, plus all worldwide populations bred in captivity for commercial purposes.

The saltwater crocodile was often hunted for its meat and eggs, and its skin is the most commercially valuable of any crocodilian. Unregulated hunting during the 20th century caused a dramatic decline in the species throughout its range, with the population in northern Australia reduced by 95% by 1971. The years from 1940 to 1970 were the peak of unregulated hunting and may have regionally caused irreparable damage to saltwater crocodile populations. The species currently has full legal protection in all Australian states and territories where it is found – Western Australia (since 1970), Northern Territory (since 1971) and Queensland (since 1974). Illegal hunting still persists in some areas, with protection in some countries being grossly ineffective, and trade is often difficult to monitor and control over such a vast range. However, many areas have not recovered; some population surveys have shown that although young crocodiles are present, fewer than 10% of specimens spotted are in adult size range and do not include any particularly large males, such as Sri Lanka or Palau. This is indicative of both potential continued persecution and exploitation and a non-recovered breeding population. In a more balanced population, such as those from Bhitarkanika National Park or Sabah on Borneo, 28% and 24.2% of specimens observed were in the adult size range of more than 3 m (9 ft 10 in).

Habitat loss continues to be a major problem for the species. In northern Australia, much of the nesting habitat of the saltwater crocodile is susceptible to trampling by feral water buffalo, although buffalo eradication programs have now reduced this problem considerably. Even where large areas of suitable habitat remain, subtle habitat alterations can be a problem, such as in the Andaman Islands, where freshwater areas, used for nesting, are being increasingly converted to human agriculture. After the commercial value of crocodile skins waned, perhaps the greatest immediate challenge to implementing conservation efforts has been the occasional danger the species can pose to humans, and the resulting negative view of the crocodile.

== Relationship with humans ==
=== Attacks on humans ===
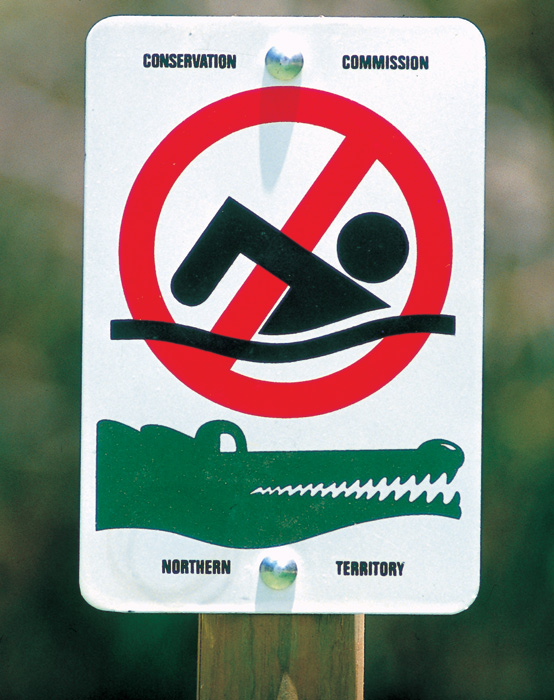
No Swimming sign used by Parks and Wildlife Commission of the Northern Territory

Of all the crocodilians, the saltwater crocodile and Nile crocodile have the strongest tendency to becoming man-eating animals. The saltwater crocodile has a long history of attacking humans who venture into its territory. As a result of its power, intimidating size, and speed, survival of a predatory attack is unlikely if the crocodile is able to make direct contact. The only recommended policy for dealing with saltwater crocodiles is to completely avoid their habitat whenever possible, as they are exceedingly aggressive when encroached upon. Exact data on attacks are limited outside Australia, where one or two fatal attacks are reported per year. From 1971 to 2013, the total number of fatalities reported in Australia due to saltwater crocodile attack was 106. The low level of attacks may be due to extensive efforts by wildlife officials in Australia to post crocodile warning signs at numerous at-risk billabongs, rivers, lakes and beaches. Less-publicised attacks have been reported in Borneo, Sumatra, Eastern India (Andaman Islands), and Burma. In Sarawak, Borneo, the average number of fatal attacks is reportedly 2.8 annually for the years from 2000 to 2003. In the Northern Territory in Australia, attempts have been made to relocate saltwater crocodiles who have displayed aggressive behaviour towards humans but these have proven ineffective as the problem crocodiles are apparently able to find their way back to their original territories. In the Darwin area from 2007 to 2009, 67–78% of "problem crocodiles" were identified as males.

Many attacks in areas outside Australia are believed to go unreported, with one study positing up to 20 to 30 attacks occur every year. This number may be conservative in light of several areas where humans and saltwater crocodiles co-exist in relatively undeveloped, low-economy and rural regions, where attacks are likely to go unreported. However, claims in the past that saltwater crocodiles are responsible for thousands of human fatalities annually are likely to have been exaggerations and were probably falsified to benefit leather companies, hunting organisations and other sources that may have benefited from maximising the negative perception of crocodiles for financial gain. Despite their reputations, many wild saltwater crocodiles are normally quite wary of humans and will go out of their way to submerge and swim away from them, even large adult males, if previously subject to harassment or persecution. Some attacks on humans appear to be territorial rather than predatory in nature, with crocodiles over two years in age often attacking anything that comes into their area (including boats). Humans can usually escape alive from such encounters, which comprise about half of all attacks. Non-fatal attacks usually involve crocodiles of 3 m (9 ft 10 in) or less in length. Fatal attacks, more likely to be predatory in motivation, commonly involve larger crocodiles with an average estimated size of 4.3 m (14 ft 1 in). Under normal circumstances, Nile crocodiles are believed to be responsible for a considerably greater number of fatal attacks on humans than saltwater crocodiles, but this may have more to do with the fact that many people in Africa tend to rely on riparian areas for their livelihood, which is less prevalent in most of Asia and certainly less so in Australia. In the Andaman Islands, the number of fatal attacks on humans has reportedly increased, possibly due to habitat destruction and reduction of natural prey.

During the Japanese retreat in the Battle of Ramree Island on 19 February 1945, saltwater crocodiles may have been responsible for the deaths of over 400 Japanese soldiers. British soldiers encircled the swampland through which the Japanese were retreating, condemning the Japanese to a night in the mangroves, which were home to thousands of saltwater crocodiles. Many Japanese soldiers did not survive this night, but the attribution of the majority of their deaths to crocodile attacks has been doubted. Another reported mass attack involved a cruise in eastern India where a boat accident forced 28 people into the water where they were reportedly consumed by saltwater crocodiles. Another notorious crocodile attack was in 1985, on ecofeminist Val Plumwood, who survived the attack and learned that the advice she had received that crocodiles do not attack canoes was inaccurate.

In July 2018, a 600-strong mob slaughtered 292 saltwater and New Guinea crocodiles in Papua province in Indonesia in a revenge attack after a man who encroached upon the sanctuary was devoured.

=== Cultural references ===
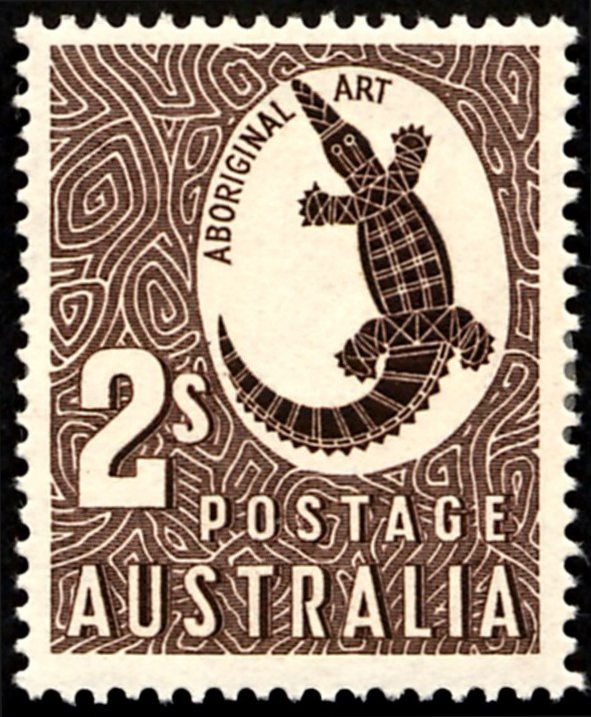
1948 postage stamp depicting an Aboriginal artwork of the saltwater crocodile

The saltwater crocodile is considered holy on Timor. According to legend, the island was formed by a giant crocodile. The Papuan people have a similar and very involved myth and traditionally the crocodile was described as a relative (normally a father or grandfather).

According to Wondjina, the mythology of Indigenous Australians, the saltwater crocodile was banished from the fresh water for becoming full of bad spirits and growing too large, unlike the freshwater crocodile, which was somewhat revered. Aboriginal rock art depicting the saltwater crocodile is rare, although examples of up to 3,000 years old were found in caves in Kakadu and Arnhem land, roughly matching the distribution of the species. It is however depicted in contemporary aboriginal art. The Larrakia people think of themselves as crocodile descendants, and regard it as their totem. They respect crocodiles as protectors of harbours and do not eat crocodile meat.

The species is featured on several postage stamps, including an 1894 State of North Borneo 12-cent stamp; a 1948 Australian 2 shilling stamp depicting an aboriginal rock artwork of the species; a 1966 Republic of Indonesia stamp; a 1994 Palau 20-cent stamp; a 1997 Australian 22-cent stamp; and a 2005 1 Malaysian ringgit postage stamp.

The saltwater crocodile has featured in contemporary Australian film and television including the Crocodile Dundee series of films, horror films Black Water and Rogue, and The Crocodile Hunter television series. There are now several saltwater crocodile–themed parks in Australia.

=== Examples of large unconfirmed saltwater crocodiles ===
The largest size recorded for a saltwater crocodile has always been a subject of considerable controversy. The reason behind unverified sizes is either the case of insufficient/inconclusive data or exaggeration from a folkloric point of view. This section is dedicated to examples of the largest saltwater crocodiles recorded outside scientific norms measurement and estimation, with the aim of satisfying the public interest without creating data pollution, as well as serving an educational purpose of guiding the reader to separate fact from possible fiction. Below, in descending order starting from the largest, are some examples of large unconfirmed saltwater crocodiles, recorded throughout history.

- A crocodile shot in the Bay of Bengal in 1840 was reported at 10.1 m (33 ft 2 in). Furthermore, this specimen was claimed to have a belly girth of 4.17 m (13 ft 8 in) and a body mass estimated 3,000 kg (6,600 lb). However, the skull of this specimen was examined by Guinness Records and found to be only 66.5 cm (2 ft 2 1/4 in) in length, indicating the above size was considerably exaggerated and the animal would have probably measured no more than 5.89 m (19 ft 4 in).
- James R. Montgomery, who ran a plantation near to the Lower Kinabatangan Segama Wetlands in Borneo from 1926 to 1932, claimed to have netted, killed, and examined numerous crocodiles well over 6.1 m (20 ft 0 in) there, including a specimen he claims measured 10 m (32 ft 10 in). However, no one scientifically confirmed any of Montgomery's specimens and no voucher specimens are known.
- A crocodile shot in Queensland in 1957, nicknamed Krys the croc (named after the woman that shot the crocodile in July 1957; Krystina Pawlowski), was reported to be 8.63 m (28 ft 4 in) long, but no verified measurements were made and no remains of this crocodile exist. A "replica" of this crocodile has been made as a tourist attraction.
- A crocodile killed in 1823 at Jalajala on the main island of Luzon in the Philippines was reported at 8.2 m (26 ft 11 in). However the skull of the specimen is 66.5 cm (26 1/4 in) long indicating an animal of approximately 6.1 m (20 ft 0 in).
- A crocodile shot in Odisha, India, was claimed to measure 7.6 m (24 ft 11 in) in life, but its skull, when given scholarly examination, was thought to have come from a crocodile of a length no greater than 7 m (23 ft 0 in).
- A reported 7.6 m (24 ft 11 in) crocodile was killed in the Hooghly River in the Alipore District of Calcutta. However, examinations of the animal's skull, one of the largest skulls known to exist for the species at 75 cm (30 in) long, actually indicating it could have measured 6.7 m (22 ft 0 in).
- In 2006, Guinness accepted a 7.01 m (23 ft 0 in), 2,000-kilogram (4,400 lb) male saltwater crocodile living within Bhitarkanika Park in Odisha. Due to the difficulty of trapping and measuring a very large living crocodile, the accuracy of these dimensions is yet to be verified. These observations and estimations have been made by park officials over the course of ten years, from 2006 to 2016, however, regardless of the skill of the observers it cannot be compared to a verified tape measurement, especially considering the uncertainty inherent in visual size estimation in the wild. In addition, this region may contain up to four other specimens measuring over 6.1 m (20 ft 0 in).
- S. Baker (1874) claimed that in Sri Lanka in the 1800s, specimens measuring 6.7 m (22 ft 0 in) or more were commonplace. However, the largest specimen killed on the island that was considered authentic by Guinness Records was a suspected man-eater killed in the Eastern Province and measuring exactly 6 m (19 ft 8 in) in length.
- The record size for a crocodile from Papua New Guinea to be considered authentic by Guinness was a 6.32 m (20 ft 9 in) specimen shot by Herb Schweighofer in May 1966 along the northeastern coast. This specimen had a belly girth of 2.74 m (9 ft 0 in).

== See also ==
- Crocodile skin
- Crocodiles in India
