= Ian Archibald =

Australian taxidermist responsible

Ian Archibald (born c. 1941) is an Australian taxidermist responsible for the preparation of animal specimens exhibited in Australian museums.

== Works ==
Ian Archibald was not formally trained in taxidermy, instead researching the techniques and receiving correspondence and direct training from experts overseas. Archibald is noted as the creator of a large crocodile specimen in 1979, early in his career, made internationally famous as a promotion for the Northern Territory in the aftermath of Cyclone Tracy. This model, Sweetheart, remained as a permanent exhibition at the Museum and Art Gallery of the Northern Territory for the next forty years.

He was involved in the intricate reconstruction of a Dromornis stirtoni specimen, excavated at the Alcoota fossil site and a featured exhibition at the Museum of Central Australia; Archibald is reported as preparing most of the animal material at that museum.

== Honours ==
A fossil species Mutpuracinus archibaldi was named by Peter F. Murray and Dirk Megirian for Archibald, a Miocene thylacinid described in 2000 from specimens found at Bullock Creek in the Territory.
