= Cassius (crocodile) =

Large crocodile in Queensland, Australia (died 2024)

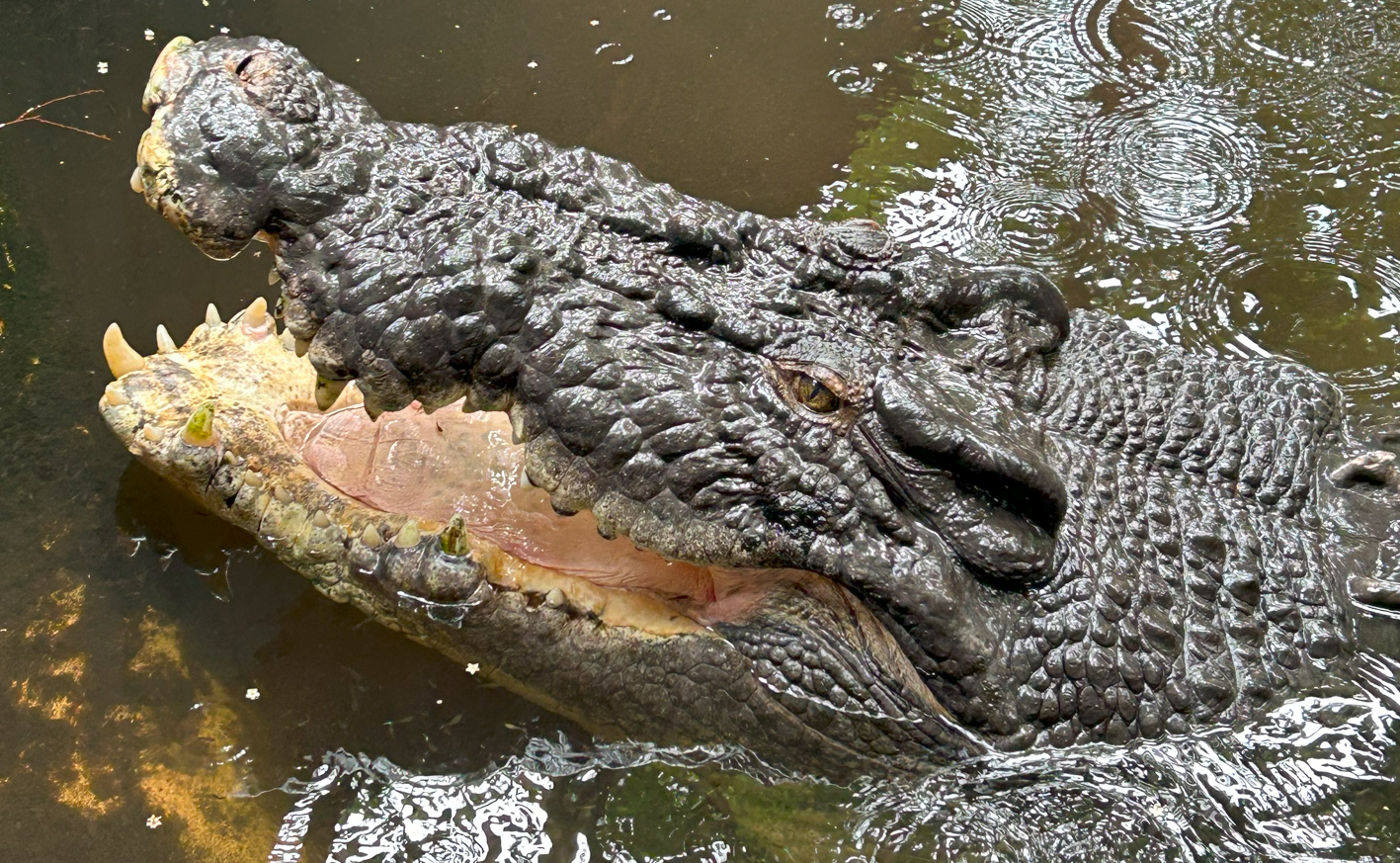
- Cassius in 2024
- Species: Crocodylus porosus (Saltwater crocodile)
- Sex: Male
- Died: 3 November 2024
- Known for: Guinness World Record "world's largest crocodile in captivity”

Cassius was a male saltwater crocodile (Crocodylus porosus) who was previously recognised by the Guinness World Records as the world's largest crocodile living in captivity in 2011. The animal measured 5.48 metres (18 ft 0 in) in length, weighed approximately 1,300 kilograms (2,870 lb), and was kept at the Marineland Crocodile Park, a zoo on Green Island, Queensland, Australia.

Cassius was officially recognized by Guinness in 2011, but lost the title in 2012 to Lolong, a 6.17 m (20 ft 3 in) saltwater crocodile caught in the southern Philippines. Cassius regained the title and held the record after Lolong's death in February 2013.

Crocodile researcher Graeme Webb said that Cassius was "a big old gnarly crocodile" aged between 30 and 80 years old when he was captured in 1984, and was "maybe 120 years" in 2023.

Cassius died in November 2024. A necropsy found no particular cause of death, indicating that he died of old age. Samples of Cassius' body were sent away in an attempt to determine his age, and his skin and head have been preserved.

== Capture ==
Cassius was known as a problem animal that attacked boats in the Northern Territory's Finniss River and was captured in 1984. Three years later, he was brought to Green Island by crocodile hunter George Craig, who had opened Marineland Melanesia in 1969. At the time of his introduction at the zoo, Cassius measured 5.30 m (17 ft 5 in).

== See also ==
- Sweetheart, a 5.1 m (17 ft) saltwater crocodile (Crocodylus porosus)
