= Longinus (disambiguation) =

Longinus (1st century) is the name ascribed to the Roman soldier who allegedly pierced the side of Jesus on the cross.

Longinus may also refer to:

== People ==
- Male members of the family Cassii Longini
- Gaius Cassius Longinus (c. 85 – 42 BCE), Roman senator and leading instigator in the plot to kill Julius Caesar
- Gaius Cassius Longinus (consul 30) (1st century), Roman jurist and politician, nephew of the tyrannicide
- Longinus or Pseudo-Longinus (c. 1st century), conventional names for the author of On the Sublime
- Gnaeus Pompeius Longinus (died 105), Roman general
- Longinus (Roman governor) (fl. 158–161), possible Roman governor of Britain
- Cassius Longinus (philosopher) (c. 213–273), Greek rhetorician and critic
- Saint Longinus (died c. 290), Roman soldier converted to Christianity by Victor of Marseilles
- Longinus (abbot) (fl. 451), Miaphysite monk and saint
- Longinus (consul 486) (fl. 475-491), Roman politician and brother of the emperor Zeno
- Longinus of Cardala (died 497), Roman official and leader during the Isaurian War
- Longinus of Selinus (died 498), Isaurian leader during the Isaurian War
- Longinus (missionary) (fl. 565–580), Byzantine Christian missionary and bishop in Nubia
- Jan Długosz (1415–1480), known in Latin as Johannes Longinus, medieval Polish historian
- Longinus Fernandes, an Indian choreographer and dancer, active 1995–present

== Fiction and literature ==
- Longinus (film), a 2004 Japanese short directed by Ryuhei Kitamura
- Longinus Podbipięta, a character in Henryk Sienkiewicz's novel With Fire and Sword
- Casca Rufio Longinus, a fictional character in Casca (series)
- Longinus, a character played by Kevin Daniels in Modern Family.

== Other uses ==
- Longinus cross, a special form of the Arma Christi cross
- Longinus Tower, an observation tower in Nottuln, Germany

== See also ==
- Cassius Longinus (disambiguation)
