= Cassius Longinus =

Cassius Longinus may refer to:

In descending chronological order:

- Cassius Longinus, end of 2nd century, beginning of 3rd century, historian only known through FGrHist 259
- Cassius Longinus (philosopher) (213 – 273 AD), a Greek rhetorician and philosopher
- Gaius Cassius Longinus (consul 30) (fl. 30–41 AD), a Roman jurist and great grandson or nephew of Gaius Cassius Longinus, who committed tyrannicide
- Longinus, also called Cassius in some traditions, the Roman soldier who pierced the side of Jesus on the cross
- Gaius Cassius Longinus (c. 86 – 42 BC), usually known as Cassius, a Roman senator and one of Julius Caesar's assassins in 44 BC
- Quintus Cassius Longinus, a tribune in 49 BC and supporter of Julius Caesar
- Lucius Cassius Longinus (praetor 66 BC), and part of the Second Catilinarian conspiracy
- Gaius Cassius Longinus (consul 73 BC)
- Gaius Cassius Longinus (consul 96 BC)
- Lucius Cassius Longinus (consul 107 BC)
- Lucius Cassius Longinus Ravilla, consul 127 BC
- Gaius Cassius Longinus (consul 171 BC)

== See also ==
- Cassia gens
- Longinus (disambiguation)
- Casca Rufio Longinus, a character from Casca (series), based on Saint Longinus
- Cassius (disambiguation)
