= Pak Nam (disambiguation) =

Samut Prakan province is one of the central provinces of Thailand.

Pak Nam or Paknam (lit. 'mouth of the river') may also refer to:

- Mueang Samut Prakan district, or Paknam Samut Prakan
  - Pak Nam Samut Prakan, a town
- Pak Nam subdistrict in Bang Khla district, Chachoengsao
- Pak Nam subdistrict in Doem Bang Nang Buat district, Suphan Buri
- Pak Nam subdistrict in La-ngu district, Satun
- Pak Nam subdistrict in Lang Suan district, Chumphon
- Pak Nam subdistrict in Mueang Chumphon district
- Pak Nam subdistrict in Mueang Krabi district
- Pak Nam subdistrict in Mueang Ranong district
- Pak Nam subdistrict in Mueang Rayong district
- Pak Nam Subdistrict in Sawankhalok district, Sukhothai
