= Pak Nam BTS station =

One of the Bangkok Skytrain stations on Skukhumvit line

Pak Nam ปากน้ำ
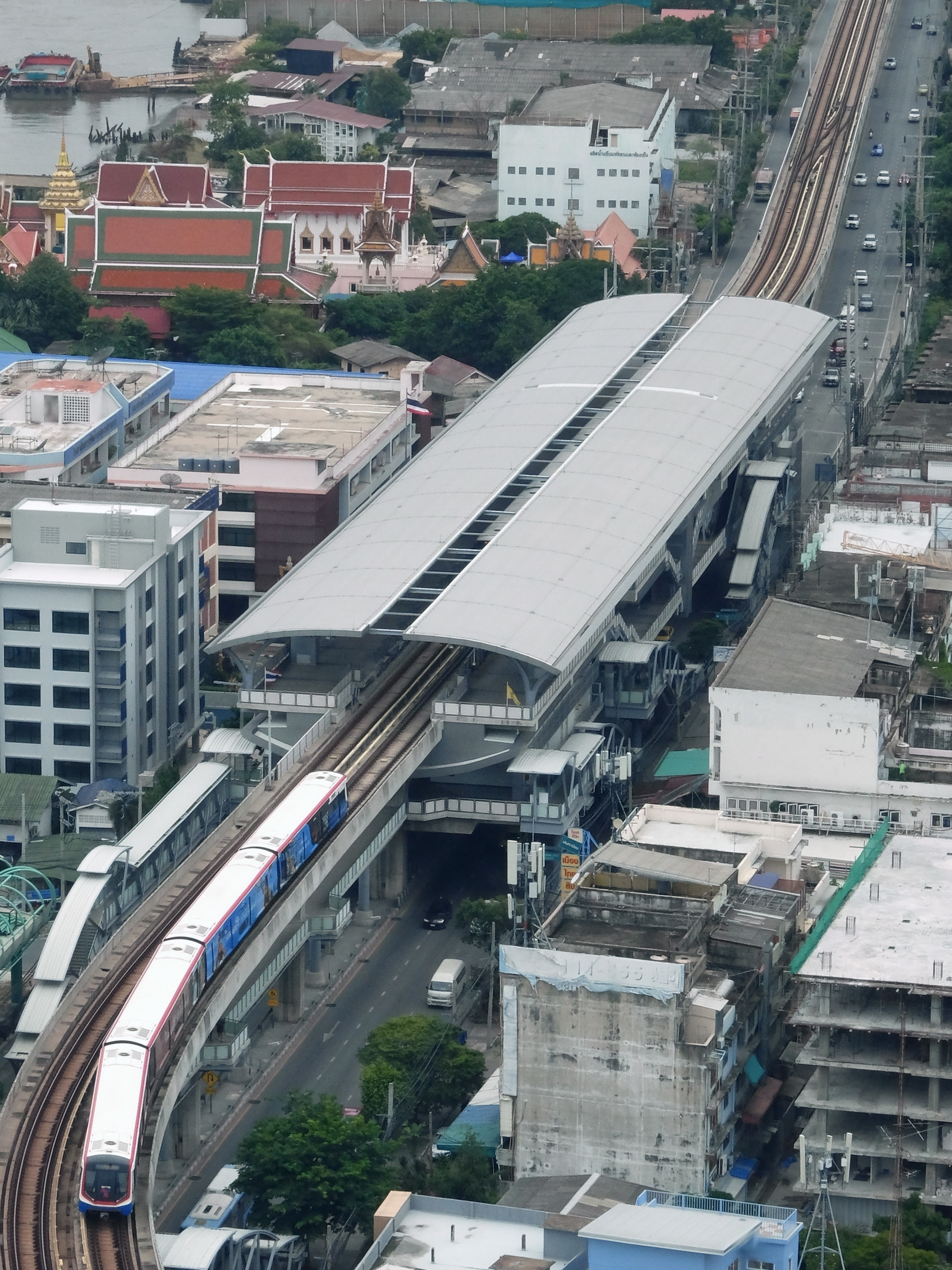

General information
- Location: Mueang Samut Prakan, Samut Prakan, Thailand
- Coordinates: 13.6022°N 100.5971°E
- System: BTS
- Owner: Bangkok Metropolitan Administration (BMA)
- Operator: Bangkok Mass Transit System; Public Company Limited (BTSC)
- Line: Sukhumvit Line

Other information
- Station code: E19

History
- Opened: 6 December 2018
- Former names: Samut Prakan City Hall; Samut Prakan

Passengers
- 2021: 774,696

Services
| Preceding station | BTS Skytrain | Following station |
|---|---|---|
| Royal Thai Naval Academy towards Khu Khot | Sukhumvit Line | Srinagarindra towards Kheha |
Location

Pak Nam Station Traditional sign

Pak Nam station (Thai: สถานีปากน้ำ, pronounced [sā.tʰǎː.nīː pàːk.náːm]) is a BTS Skytrain station, on the Sukhumvit Line in Samut Prakan Province, Thailand.

It opened on 6 December 2018 as part of the 13 km eastern extension. Rides on the extension were free until April 16, 2019.

== History ==
In official proposals, the station was initially named Samut Prakan City Hall station due to its location next to Samut Prakan Provincial Hall and the city's district office. During construction it was renamed Samut Prakan. In the end, the Royal Society of Thailand requested to the Mass Rapid Transit Authority of Thailand that the name be changed to Pak Nam to match the local subdistrict name and represent Samut Prakan's former name which was "Pak Nam".

== See also ==
- Bangkok Skytrain
