= Chang Erawan BTS station =

BTS Skytrain station in Samut Prakan Province, Thailand

Chang Erawan ช้างเอราวัณ
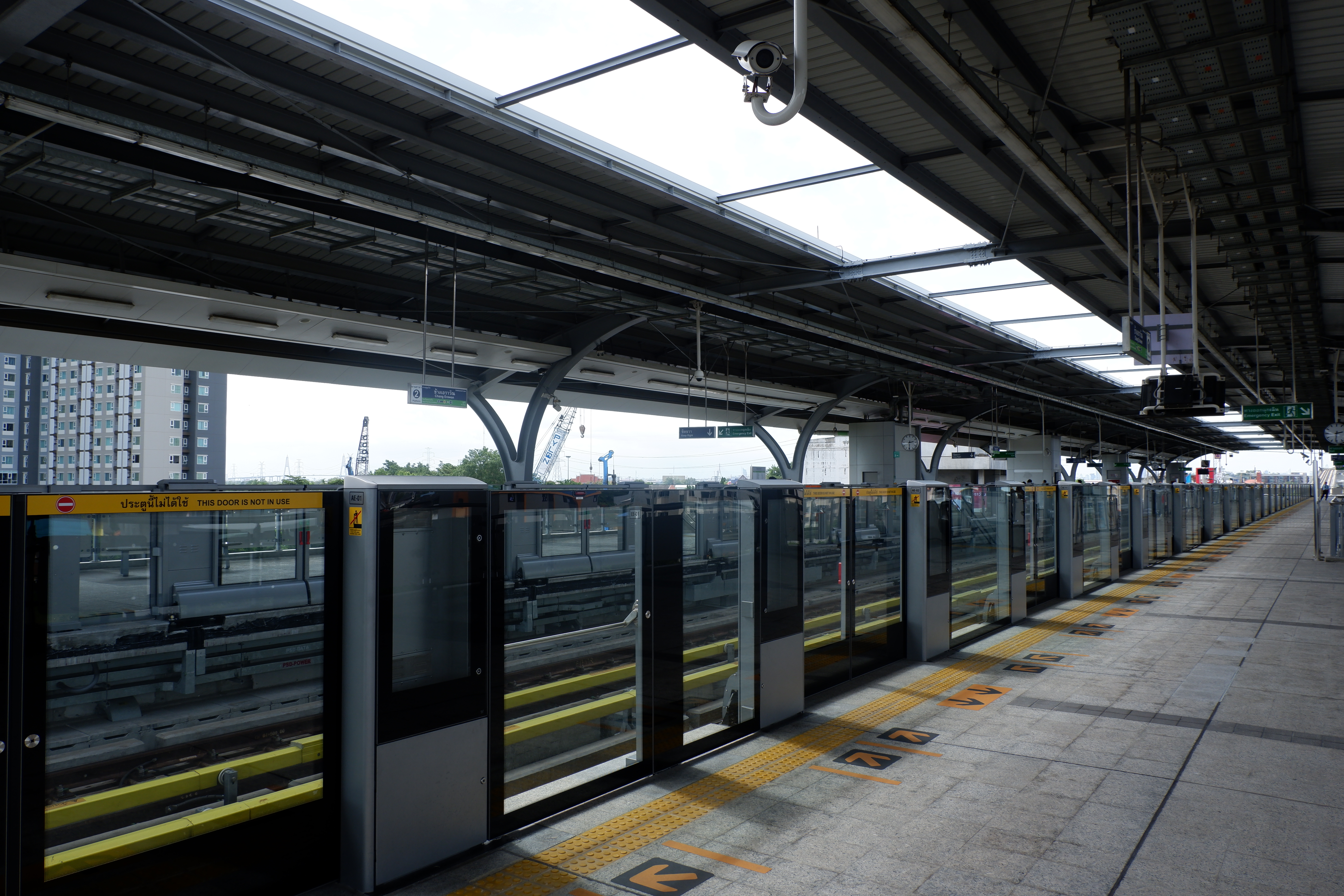

General information
- Location: Mueang Samut Prakan, Samut Prakan, Thailand
- Coordinates: 13.6216°N 100.5901°E
- System: BTS
- Owner: Bangkok Metropolitan Administration (BMA)
- Operator: Bangkok Mass Transit System; Public Company Limited (BTSC)
- Line: Sukhumvit Line

Other information
- Station code: E17

History
- Opened: 6 December 2018
- Former names: Erawan Museum

Passengers
- 2021: 820,701

Services
Preceding station	BTS Skytrain	Following station
Pu Chao towards Khu Khot	Sukhumvit Line	Royal Thai Naval Academy towards Kheha
Location

Chang Erawan Station Traditional sign

Chang Erawan station (Thai: สถานีช้างเอราวัณ, RTGS: Sathani Chang Erawan, pronounced [sā.tʰǎː.nīː tɕʰáːŋ ʔēː.rāː.wān]) is a BTS Skytrain station, on the Sukhumvit Line in Samut Prakan Province, Thailand.

It opened on 6 December 2018 as part of the 13 km eastern extension. Rides on the extension were free until April 16, 2019. The station is near with Erawan Museum on Sukhumvit Road.

== See also ==
- Bangkok Skytrain
