= Pu Chao BTS station =

One of the Bangkok Skytrain stations on Skukhumvit line

Pu Chao ปู่เจ้า
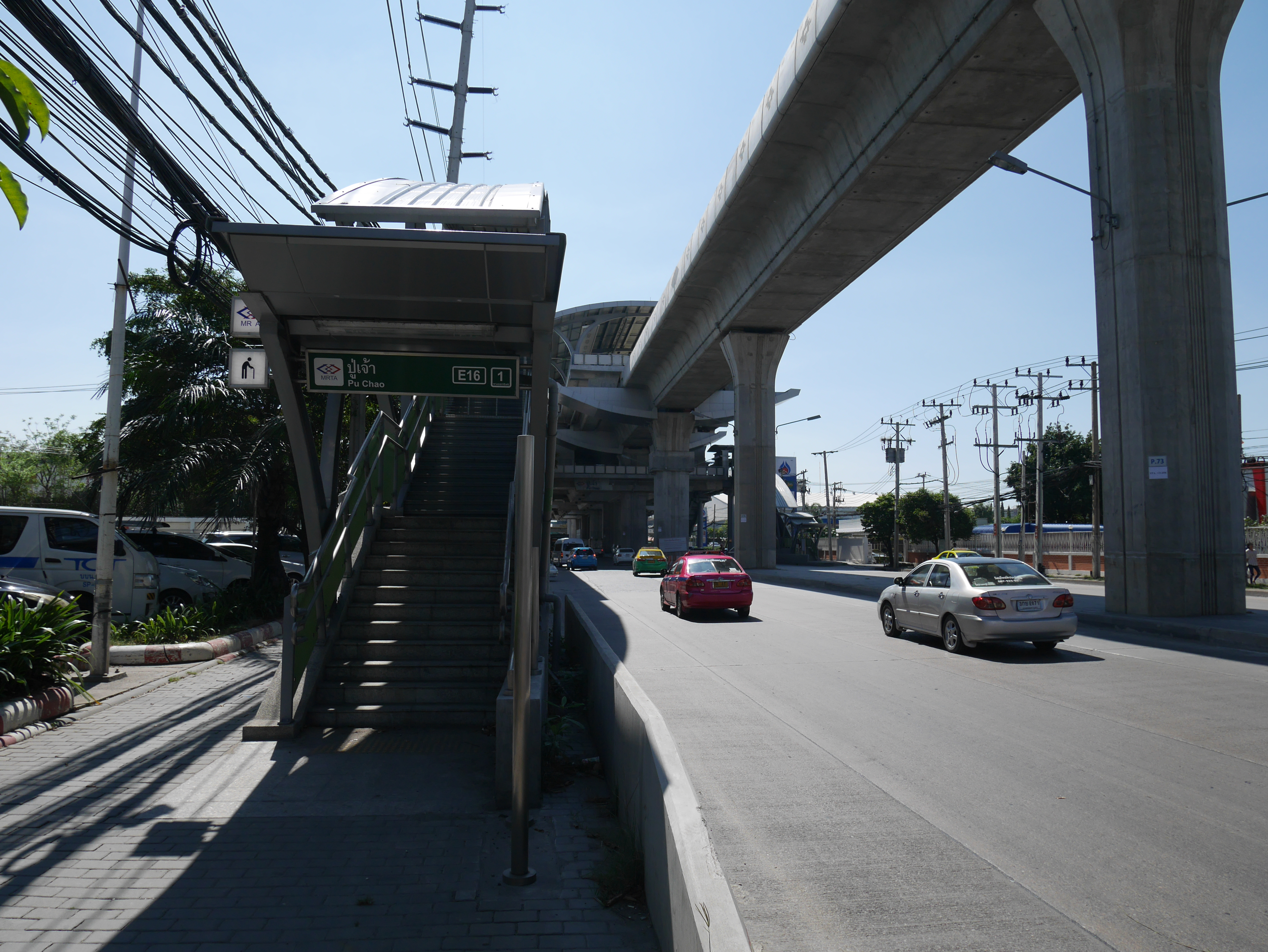

General information
- Location: Mueang Samut Prakan, Samut Prakan, Thailand
- Coordinates: 13.6374°N 100.5920°E
- System: BTS
- Owner: Bangkok Metropolitan Administration (BMA)
- Operator: Bangkok Mass Transit System; Public Company Limited (BTSC)
- Line: Sukhumvit Line

Other information
- Station code: E16

History
- Opened: 6 December 2018
- Former names: Pu Chao Saming Phrai

Passengers
- 2021: 801,317

Services
Preceding station	BTS Skytrain	Following station
Samrong towards Khu Khot	Sukhumvit Line	Chang Erawan towards Kheha
Location

Pu Chao Station Traditional sign

Pu Chao station (Thai: สถานีปู่เจ้า) is a BTS Skytrain station, on the Sukhumvit Line in Samut Prakan Province, Thailand.

It opened on 6 December 2018 as part of the 13 km eastern extension. Rides on the extension were free until April 16, 2019.

== History ==
In official proposals, the station was initially named Pu Chao Saming Phrai station due to its location near Pu Chao Saming Phrai Road. The Royal Society of Thailand requested to the Mass Rapid Transit Authority of Thailand that the name be shortened to Pu Chao for ease of use.

== See also ==
- Bangkok Skytrain
