= Royal Thai Naval Academy BTS station =

One of the Bangkok Skytrain stations on Skukhumvit line

Royal Thai Naval Academy โรงเรียนนายเรือ
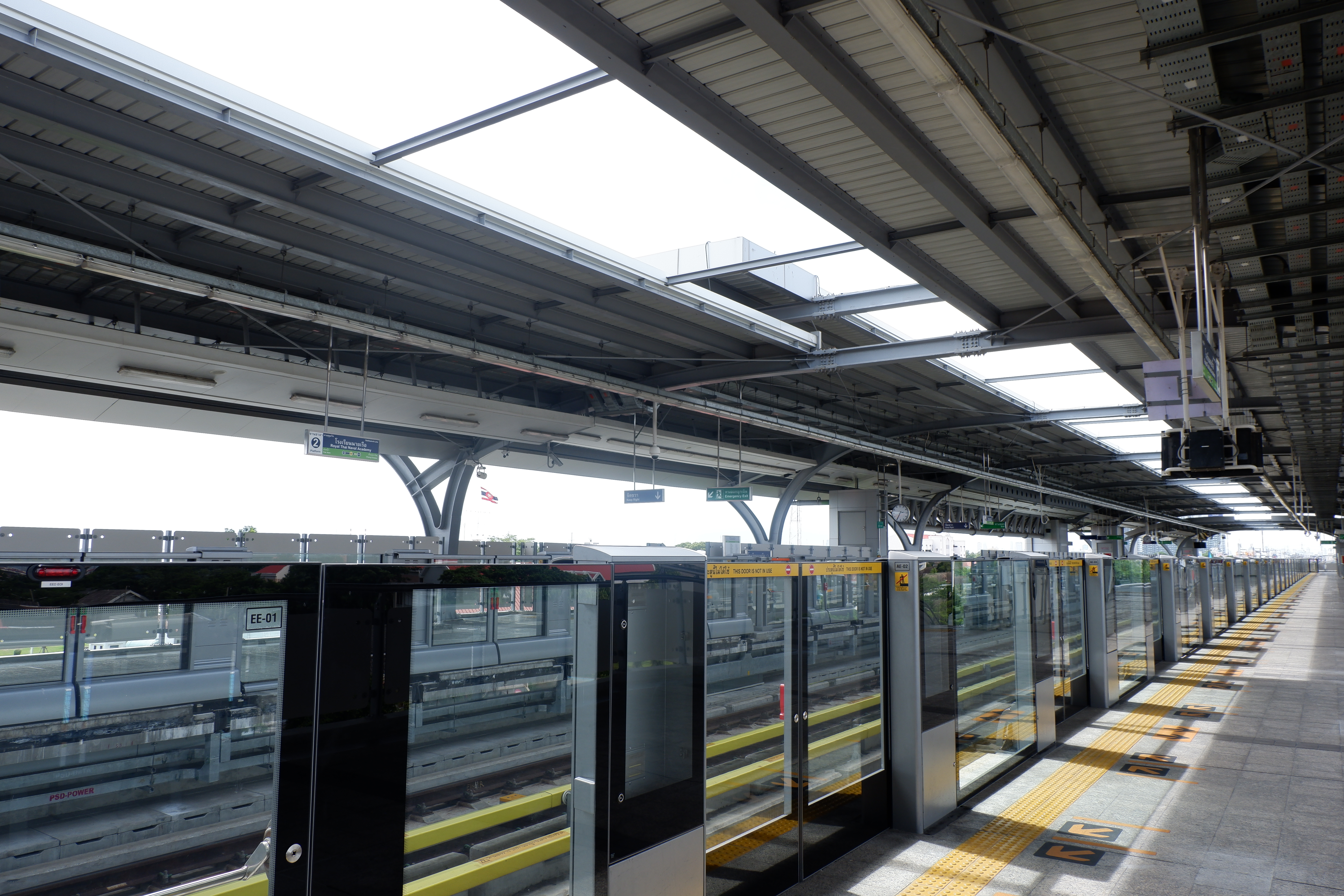

General information
- Location: Mueang Samut Prakan, Samut Prakan, Thailand
- Coordinates: 13.6086°N 100.5948°E
- System: BTS
- Owner: Bangkok Metropolitan Administration (BMA)
- Operator: Bangkok Mass Transit System; Public Company Limited (BTSC)
- Line: Sukhumvit Line

Other information
- Station code: E18

History
- Opened: 6 December 2018

Passengers
- 2021: 516,246

Services
Preceding station	BTS Skytrain	Following station
Chang Erawan towards Khu Khot	Sukhumvit Line	Pak Nam towards Kheha
Location

Royal Thai Naval Academy Station Traditional sign

Royal Thai Naval Academy station (Thai: สถานีโรงเรียนนายเรือ, RTGS: Sathani Rong Rian Nai Rua) is a BTS Skytrain station, on the Sukhumvit Line in Samut Prakan Province, Thailand.

It opened on 6 December 2018 as part of the 13 km eastern extension. Rides on the extension were free until April 16, 2019. The station is near the Royal Thai Naval Academy.

== See also ==
- Bangkok Skytrain
