= Crocodile farm =

Establishment for breeding and raising of crocodilians

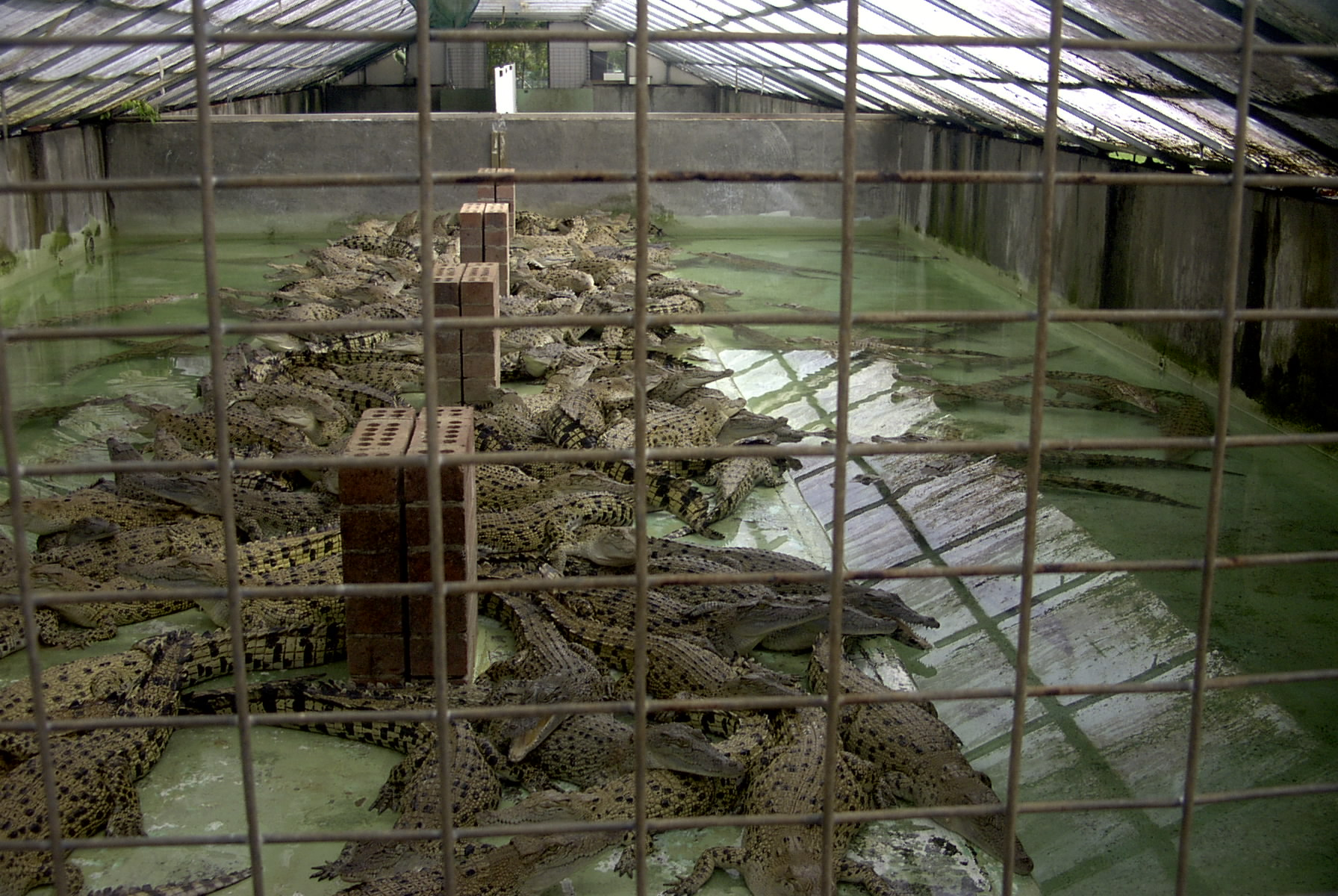
Saltwater crocodile farm in Australia

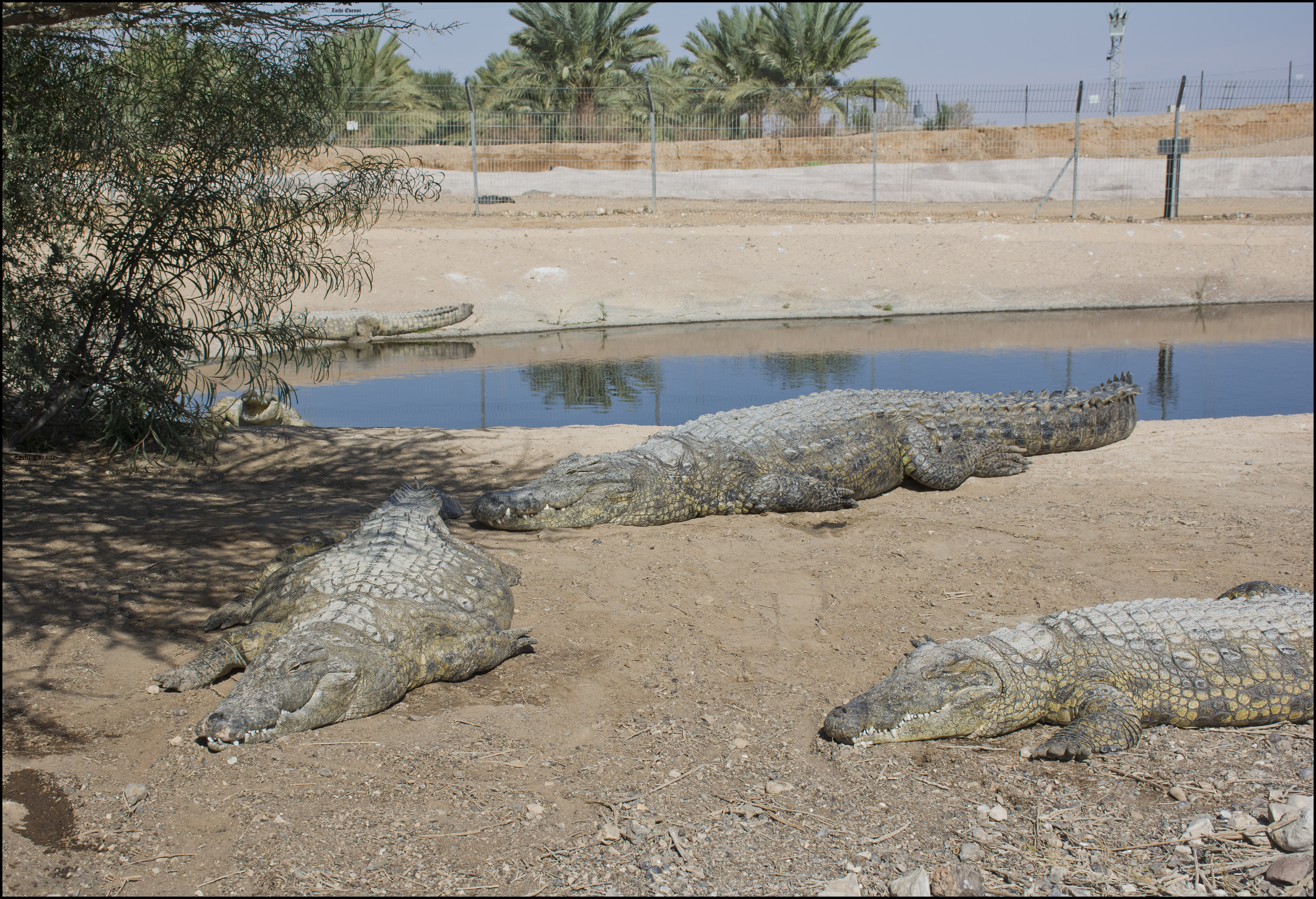
Nile crocodile farm in Israel

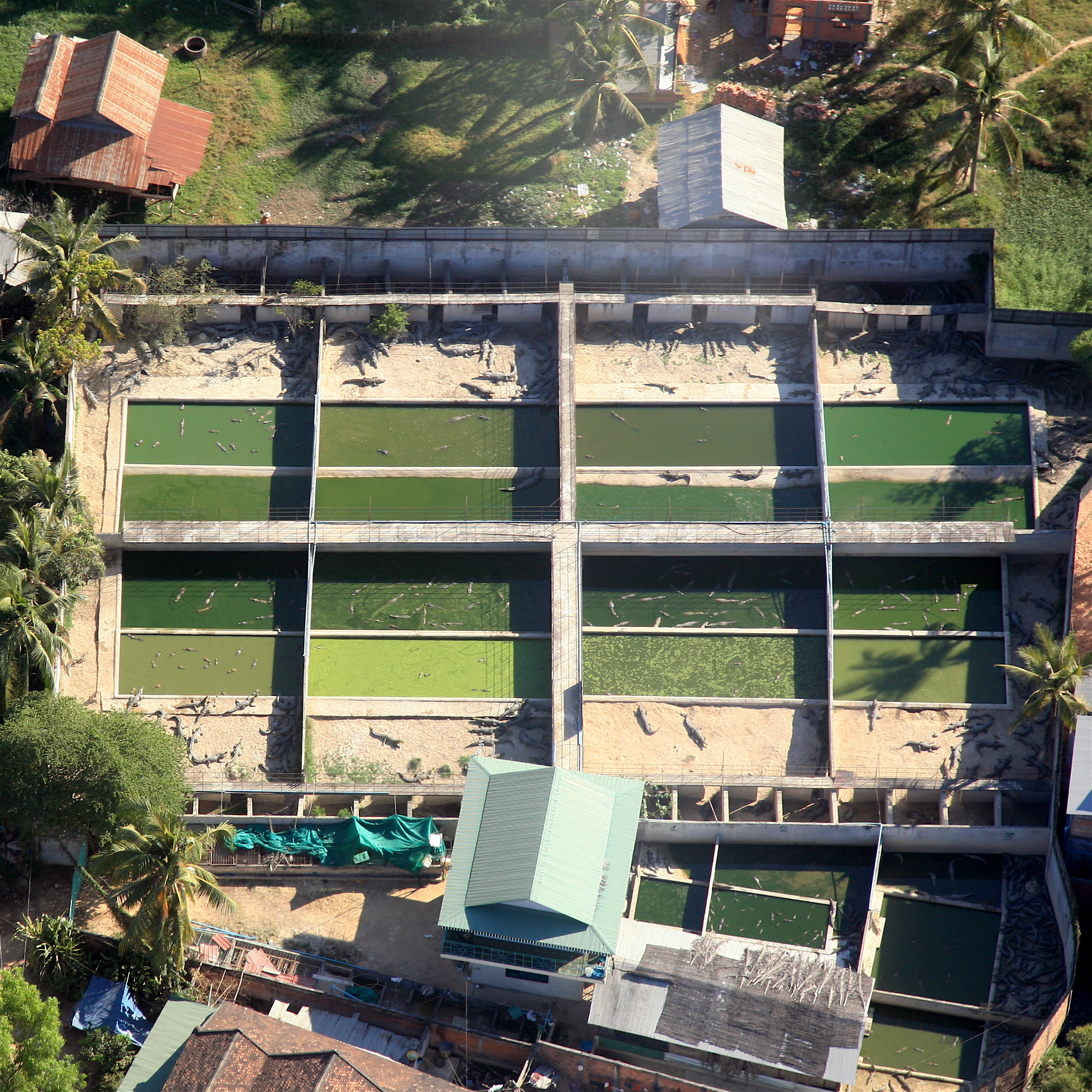
Aerial view of a Cambodian crocodile farm

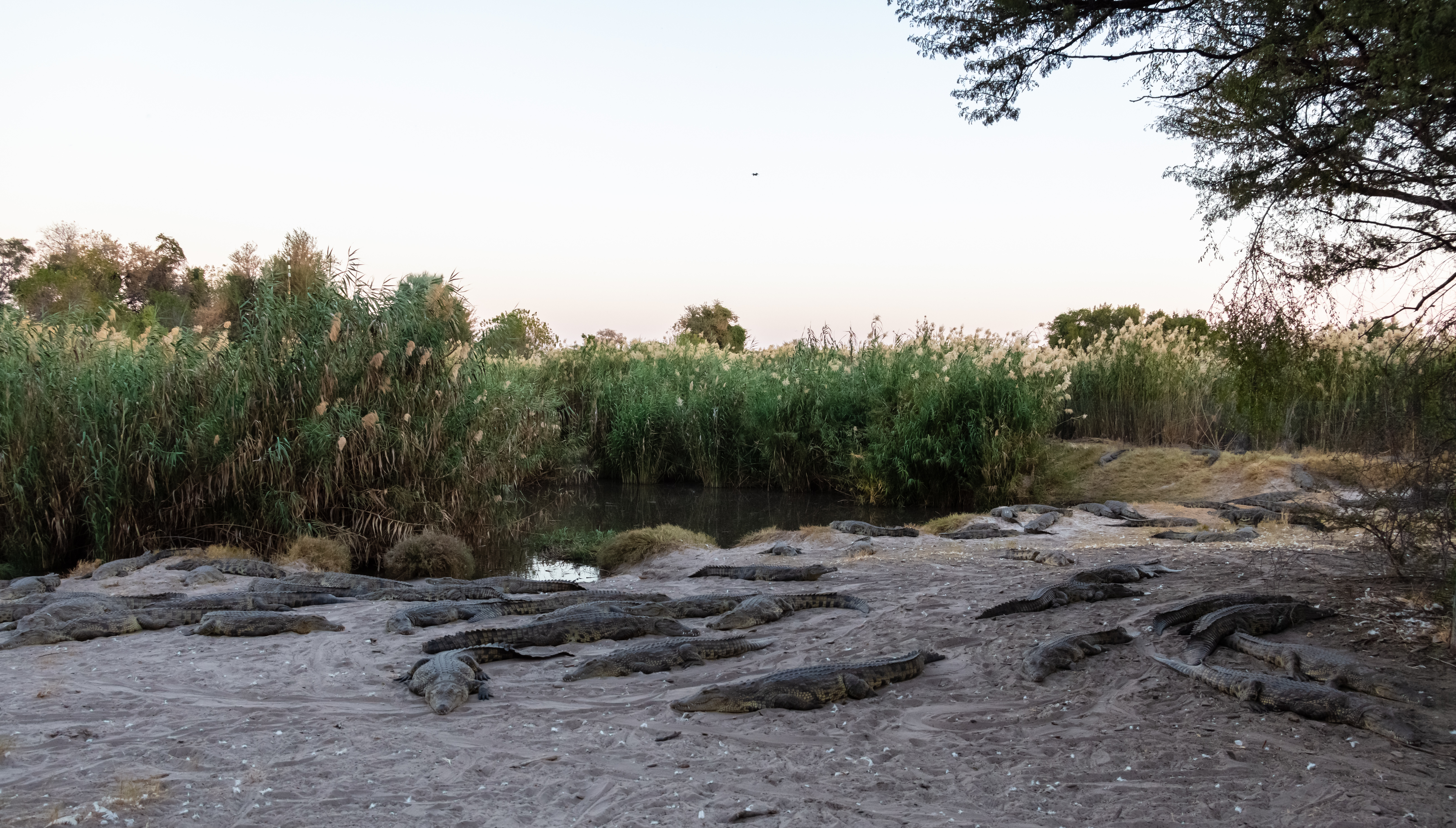
Farm in Maun, Botswana

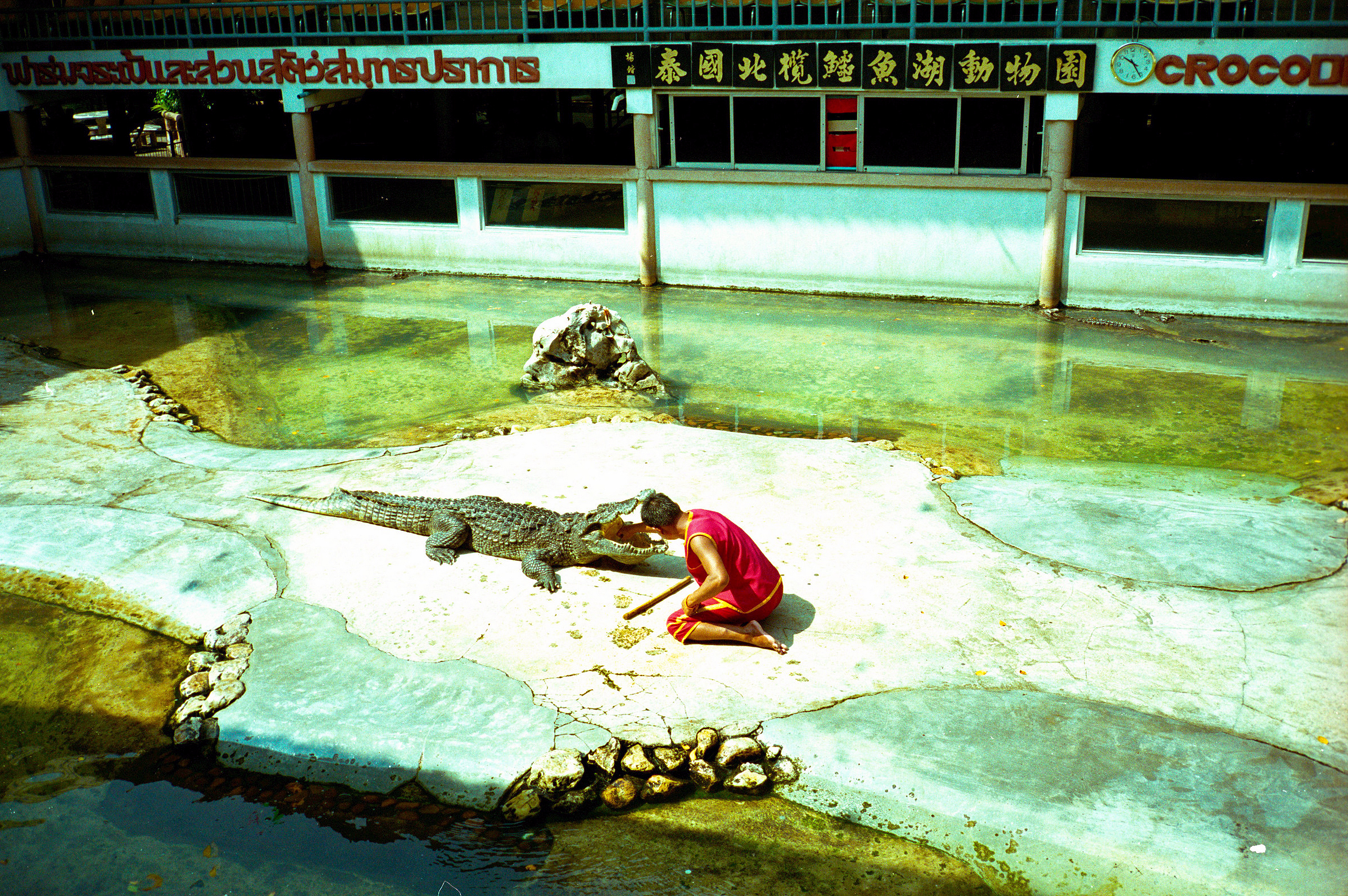
Samutprakarn Crocodile Farm in Thailand

A crocodile farm or alligator farm is an establishment for breeding and raising of crocodilians in order to produce crocodile and alligator meat, leather from crocodile and alligator skin, and other goods. Many species of both alligators and crocodiles are farmed internationally. In Louisiana alone, alligator farming is a $60 to $70 million industry. Most crocodile farms are located in Thailand. Around 1.33-1.5 million crocodiles were slaughtered from 2007 to 2010 in crocodile farms.

== History ==
Alligators and crocodiles are not truly domesticated and their being bred in farms probably began as late as the early 20th century. Most of the early businesses, such as St. Augustine Alligator Farm Zoological Park, established in 1893, were farms in name only, primarily keeping alligators and crocodiles as a tourist attraction. Only in the 1960s did commercial operations that either harvested eggs from the wild or bred alligators on-site begin to appear. This was largely driven by diminishing stocks of wild alligators, which had been hunted nearly to extinction by that time.

As the American alligator was placed under official protection in 1967 (under a law preceding the 1973 Endangered Species Act), farming alligators for skins became the most viable option for producing leather. Mostly concentrated in the Southern U.S. states of Louisiana, Florida, and Georgia, the practice quickly spread to other nations. Both the American and Chinese alligator are farmed intensively today, mostly within each species' respective native region. The Nile crocodile is found in ranches all over Africa, and the saltwater crocodile is farmed in Australia and other areas. The smaller caimans are generally not of enough market value to farm, though captive breeding of the spectacled caiman does take place in South America.

Farming alligators and crocodiles first grew out of the demand for skins, which can fetch hundreds of dollars each. But alligator and crocodile meat, long a part of Southern cooking (especially Cajun cuisine) and some Asian and African cuisines, began to be sold and shipped to markets unfamiliar with crocodilian meat. Chinese cuisine based on traditional Chinese medicine considers the meat to be a curative food for colds and cancer prevention, although there is no scientific evidence to support this. Crocodile meat was eaten, albeit rarely and as an exotic dish, in Vietnamese cuisine, but it was taboo and off limits for Chinese. In Vietnam, skinning is performed on still living crocodiles.

== Effects ==
A common misconception is that crocodilians are an easy source of revenue and not difficult to care for in captivity; however, few crocodilian businesses are successful in the developing world. To offset overhead costs and have a regular source of income, crocodilian facilities can add tourism; in this way alligator farming can assist native species and provide people with work.

Alligator farming has minimal adverse effects on the environment, and has at least two positive direct effects on alligator conservation. Because the luxury goods industry has a reliable stream of product, illegal poaching is reduced. Juvenile crocodilians can also be released into the wild to support a steady population. Wild alligator conservation has also benefited indirectly from farming. Ranching businesses protect alligator habitats to take care of nesting sites. The fiscal incentive to keep a healthy environment for breeding alligators means that the environment and its wildlife are seen as an economic resource. This can augment the government's willingness to take care of crocodilian populations.

Animals other than crocodilians may benefit from a similar application of sustainable and ethical farming.

== Methods ==
Ranching, wild harvesting, and captive breeding are the three ways to obtain crocodilians recognized by the Convention on International Trade in Endangered Species (CITES) and the Crocodile Specialist Group (CSG). Alligators can be raised in captivity on farms or on ranches. Alligator farms breed alligators, whereas ranches incubate and rear hatchlings collected from the wild. Farms do collect eggs from the wild but they also keep breeding adults in their facilities to produce their own eggs whereas ranches do not. Farming and ranching operations typically return a certain percentage of juveniles to the wild at a size associated with a high survival rate, an approach that increases overall alligator survival rates from the low numbers of successful eggs and juveniles usually observed in the wild.

Crocodiles can be housed in a number of ways depending on the goals of the rearing facility. Large areas of a lake or marsh can be enclosed for many individuals or a smaller area can be created for fewer individuals. Due to the size and lifespan of the animals, adult crocodiles need a substantial amount of space. Tourism can bring additional revenue to crocodile rearing facilities, but they must be made safe for the public and the crocodiles, while maintaining an aesthetically pleasing environment. This frequently depends on enclosures that can be easily cleaned without harming the animals. If closed to public viewing, facilities have fewer requirements and can have a more practical design.

Alligators and crocodiles can be raised in captivity with "open cycle" or "closed cycle" methods. Open cycle refers to programs that are concerned with the health of the wild population and are using captive rearing as a means to supplement the wild populations. Closed-cycle operations are primarily concerned with harvest. In closed cycle operations, adult females are kept in captivity, and the eggs they lay are collected, incubated artificially, hatched, and the juveniles are grown to a certain size and harvested. Closed cycle operations provide no incentive for conservation and are often unsuccessful because the cost of starting and managing the operation often outweighs the profits gained from products. Although the cost of operating an open cycle operation is comparable to closed cycle, the goal of an open cycle operation is the overall health of the species, rather than economic profit. Captive breeding and ranching operations provide more incentive to protect natural populations and are important contributors to the success of crocodilian populations.

== Concerns ==
=== Animal welfare ===
Welfare concerns include the threat of crocodilian diseases such as caiman pox, adenoviral Hepatitis, mycoplasmosis, and chlamydiosis. Crocodiles suffer from stress in confined spaces such as farms, leading to disease outbreaks. Most crocodilians keep a body temperature within 28 and 33 degrees Celsius. On farms, body temperatures can reach 36 degrees Celsius, which affects the animals' immune system, and puts them at risk of various illnesses. Another concern is for the cleanliness of the water in enclosures.

=== Pests ===
Many alligator farms in the United States have experienced losses due to Sus scrofa (feral swine) destroying nests.

=== Disease ===
Between 2001 and 2003, West Nile virus (WNV) infected and caused deaths resulting in economic loss in American alligators in Georgia, Florida, Louisiana, and Idaho. The disease is transmitted by mosquitoes. WNV has been found in Mexico at a crocodile farm in Ciudad del Carmen.

The skin, most notably the underside, of alligators and crocodiles is of commercial value, so diseases of the skin need to be treated properly and effectively.

Commercial crocodile meat is widely consumed in Thailand, with a surge in popularity in 2022 as rising pork prices due to inflation led consumers to seek alternative protein sources. The meat is leaner than pork, attracting health-conscious individuals. Since the 1950s, the Samutprakarn Crocodile Farm and Zoo have been supplying crocodile meat both domestically and internationally. As a commercial industry, local producers have established safe and hygienic processing methods, with approval from the Thai Ministry of Public Health. While information on this topic is limited, there have been no reported nationwide outbreaks of salmonellosis or typhoid linked to crocodile meat consumption in Thailand.

Crocodilian diseases vary between species. Salmonellosis is common on some farms, and is acquired from infected food; it may also be spread by poor hygiene practices. Chlamydia, (specifically Chlamydophila psittaci) can persist for years if not treated, for example with tetracycline. Crocodilians may acquire mycobacteria from infected meat.

Illnesses affecting crocodilians include crocodile pox, which is caused by Parapoxvirus, affecting hatchlings and juveniles. It causes a brown residue to form around the eyes, oral cavity, and tail. Caiman pox similarly causes white lesions around the eyes, oral cavity, and tail. Adenoviral hepatitis causes organ failure and death. Mycoplasmosis causes polyarthritis and pneumonia in crocodilians under the age of three. Infected animals have swollen jaws and are unable to move. Chlamydiosis has two forms that affects juveniles under one year of age. The first causes acute hepatitis, usually resulting in death. The other causes chronic bilateral conjunctivitis, usually resulting in blindness. Parasitic infections include tapeworm cysts, Trichinella spiralis nelsoni in the meat of Nile crocodiles in Zimbabwe, and Coccidia.

=== Escape ===
There have been reports of crocodiles escaping from farms during flooding. In 2013, approximately 15,000 crocodiles were released into the Limpopo River from flood gates at the nearby Rakwena Crocodile Farm. Escaping is a common occurrence in Thailand, and the escaped crocodiles are often euthanized due to concerns for public safety. Economic downturns which were exacerbated by the Covid-19 pandemic have led to the bankruptcy of many crocodile farms or the passing of their owners, resulting in inadequate maintenance of enclosures. Without proper oversight, crocodiles may resort to cannibalism, increasing the risk of disease transmission, which could pose a public health threat if they escape into surrounding environments.

== Gallery ==
Los Angeles Alligator farm, ca.1900

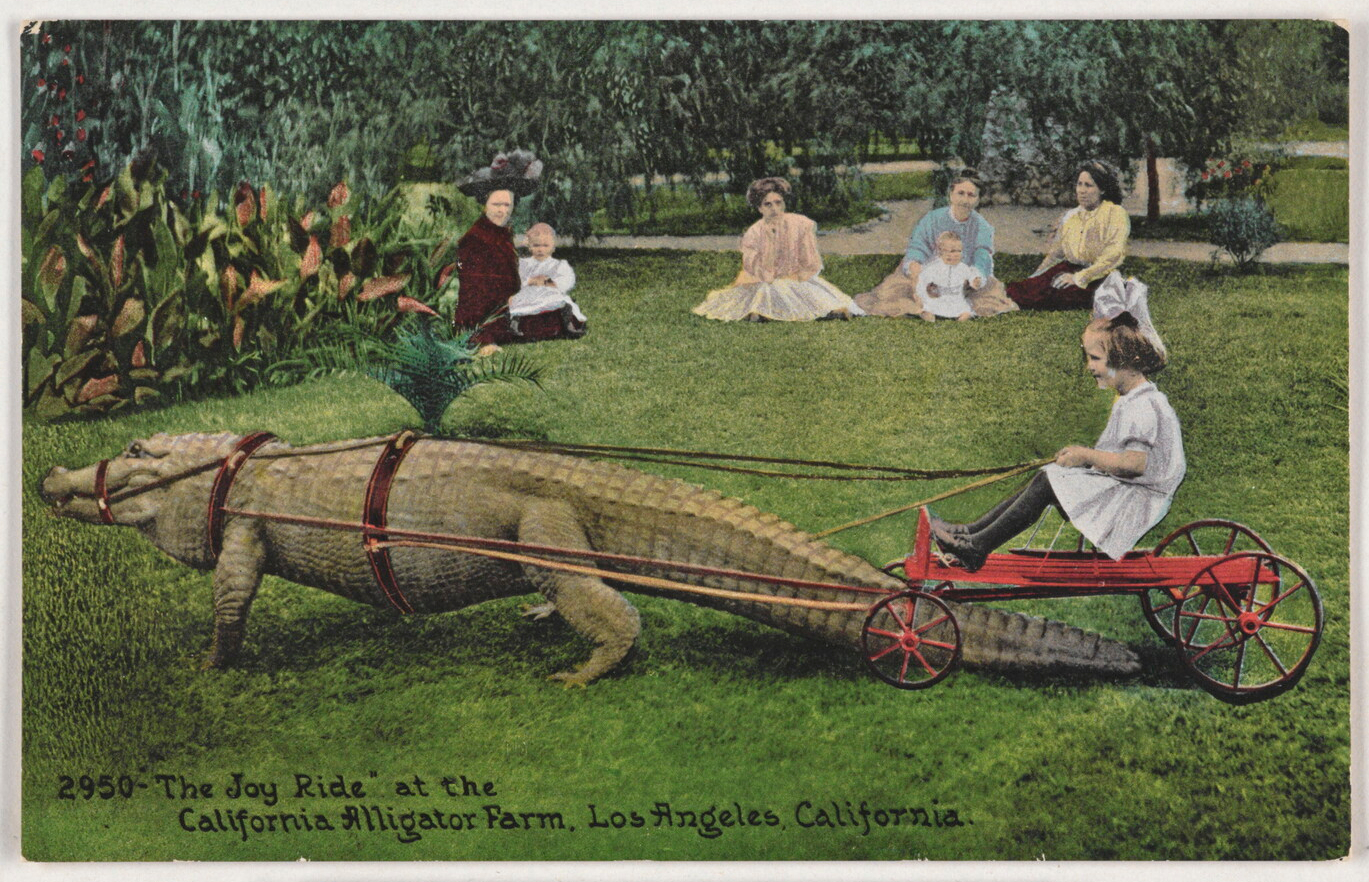
Edward H. Mitchell, "The Joy Ride" at the California Alligator Farm, Los Angeles, California, c. 1910s

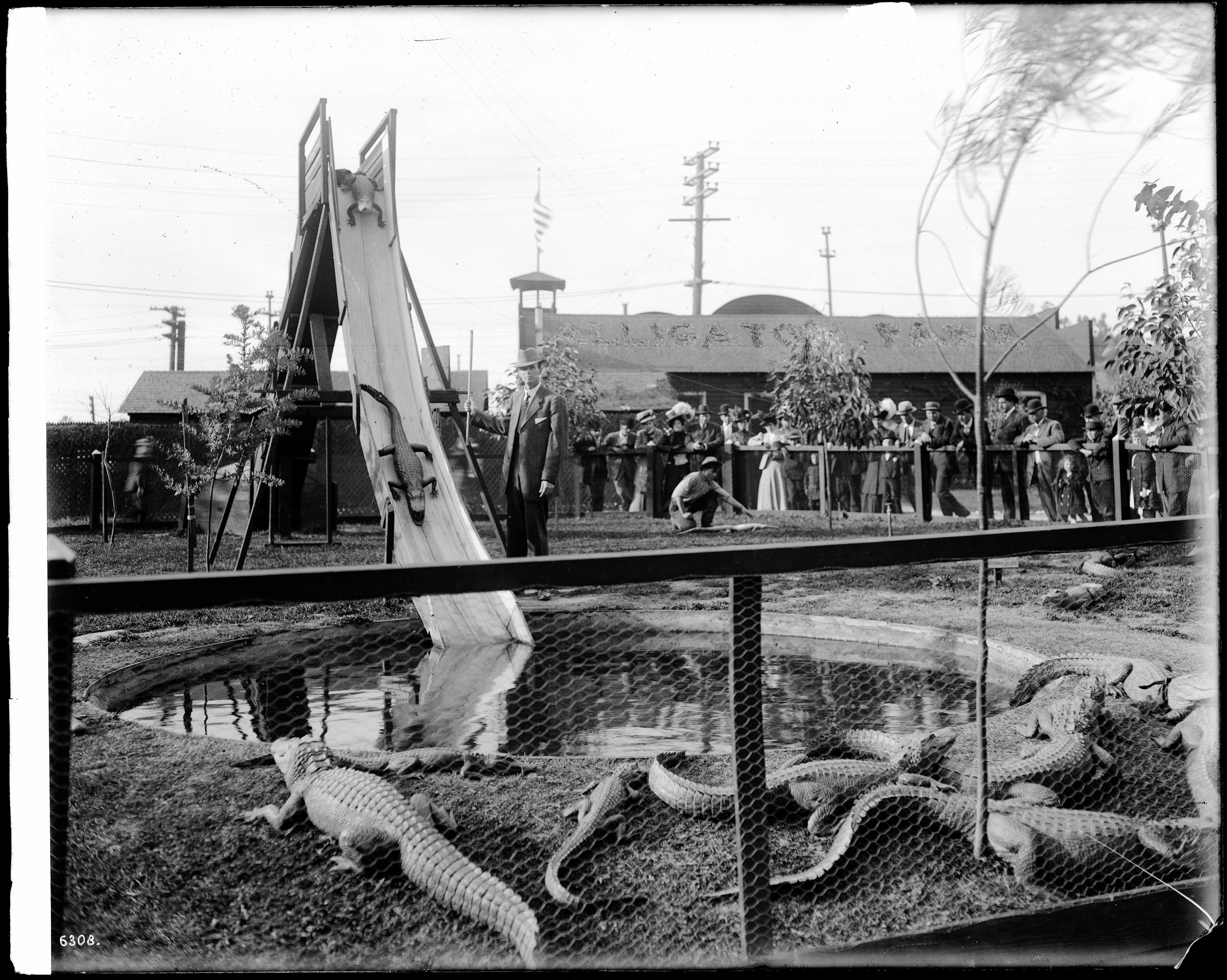
Alligators going down a toboggan slide

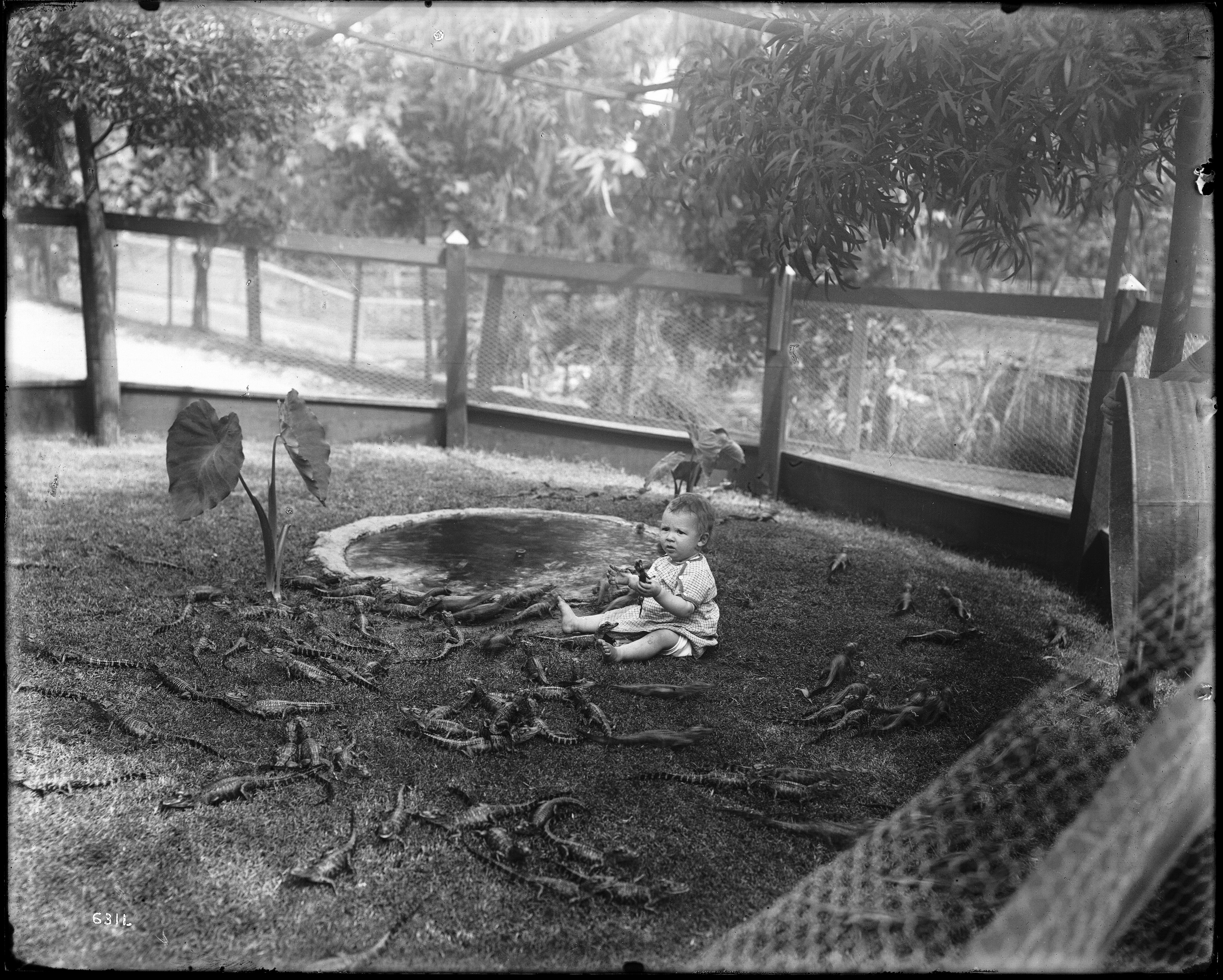
A baby playing with young alligators

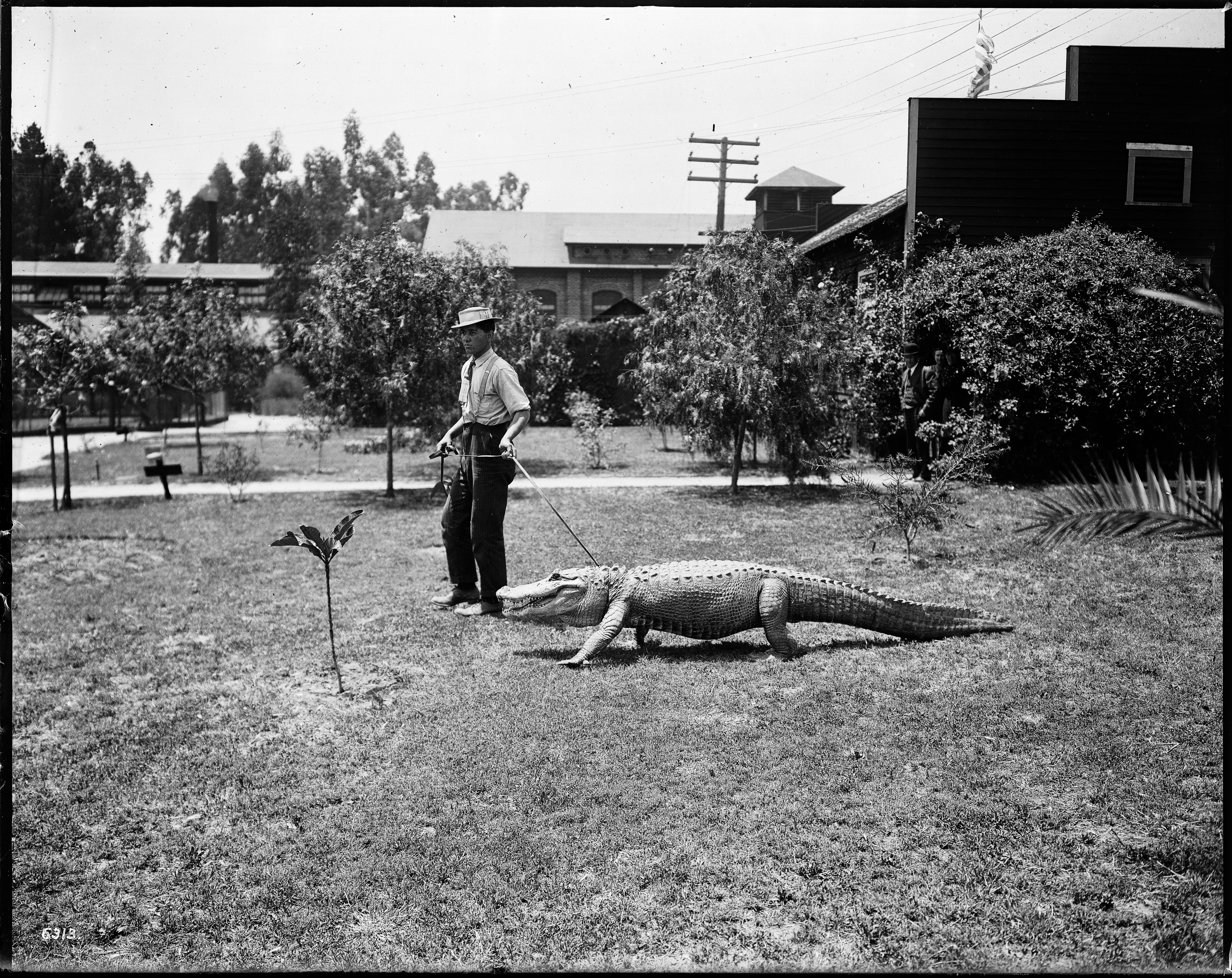
A man leading an alligator via leash

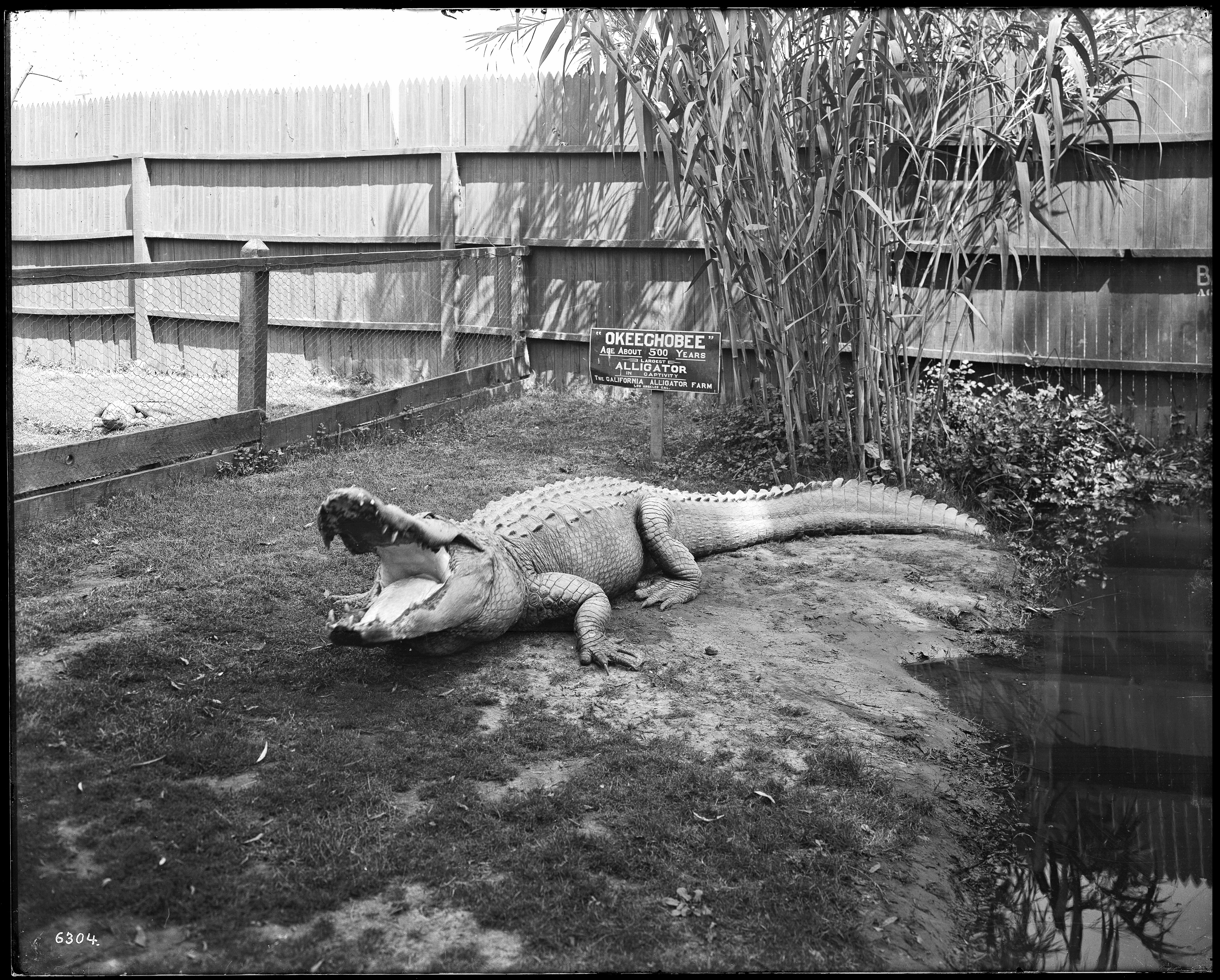
Photograph of "Okeechobee" in its pen ca.1900. The sign posted behind it reads "OKEECHOBEE / Age About 500 Years / The Largest Alligator in Captivity / The California Alligator Farm / Los Angeles, CA".

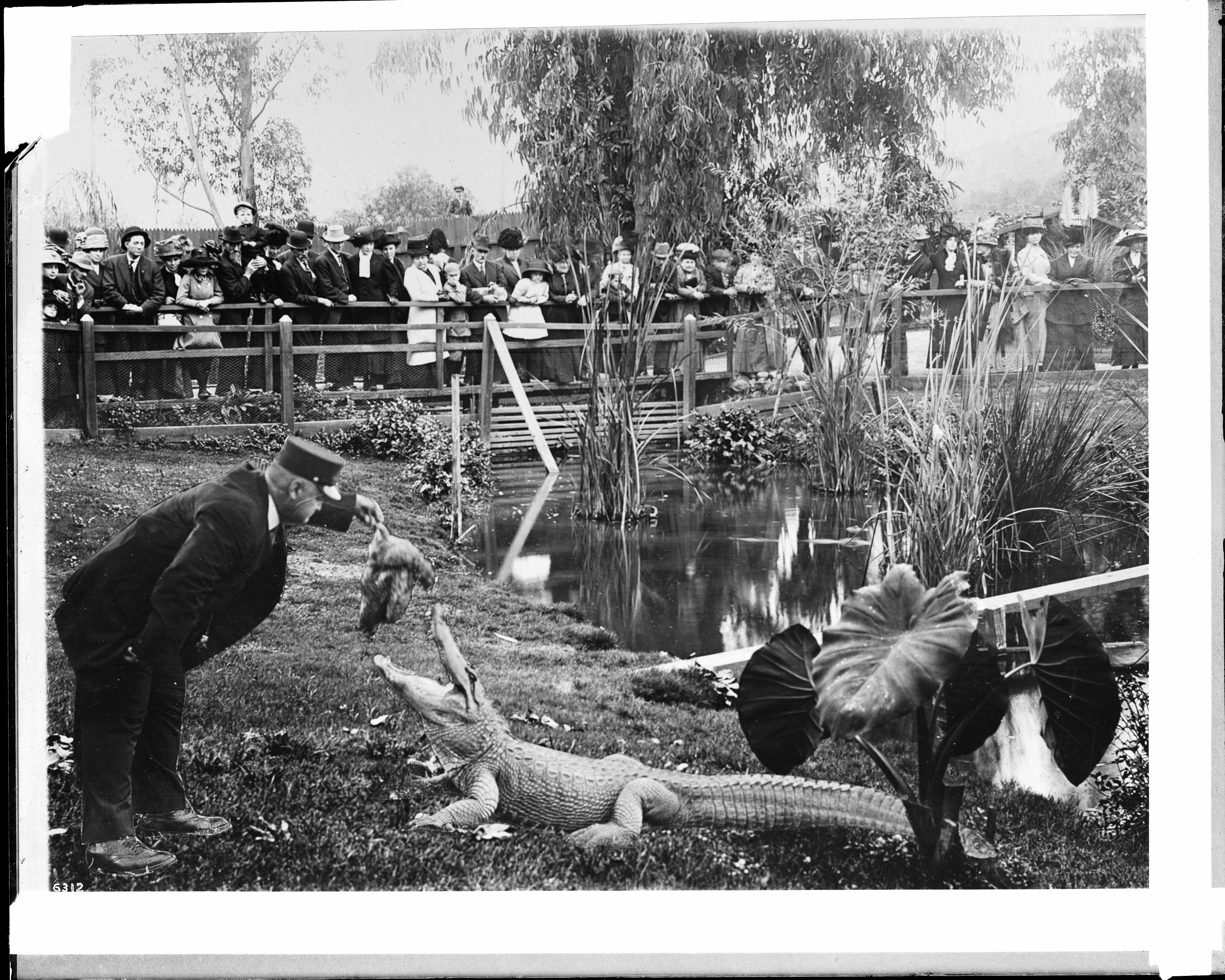
A uniformed man feeding an alligator at an alligator farm

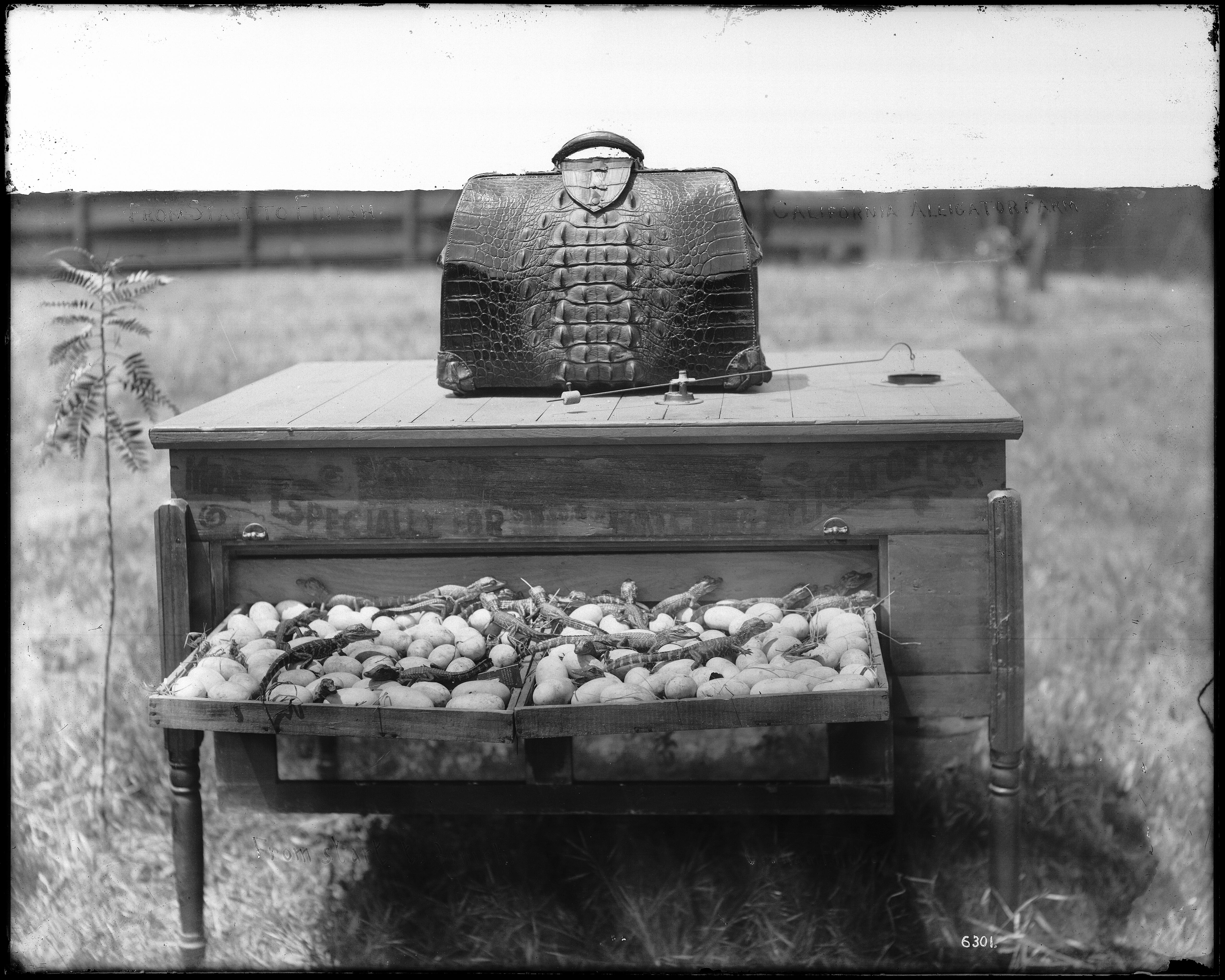
An incubator on an alligator farm

== See also ==
- Animal–industrial complex
