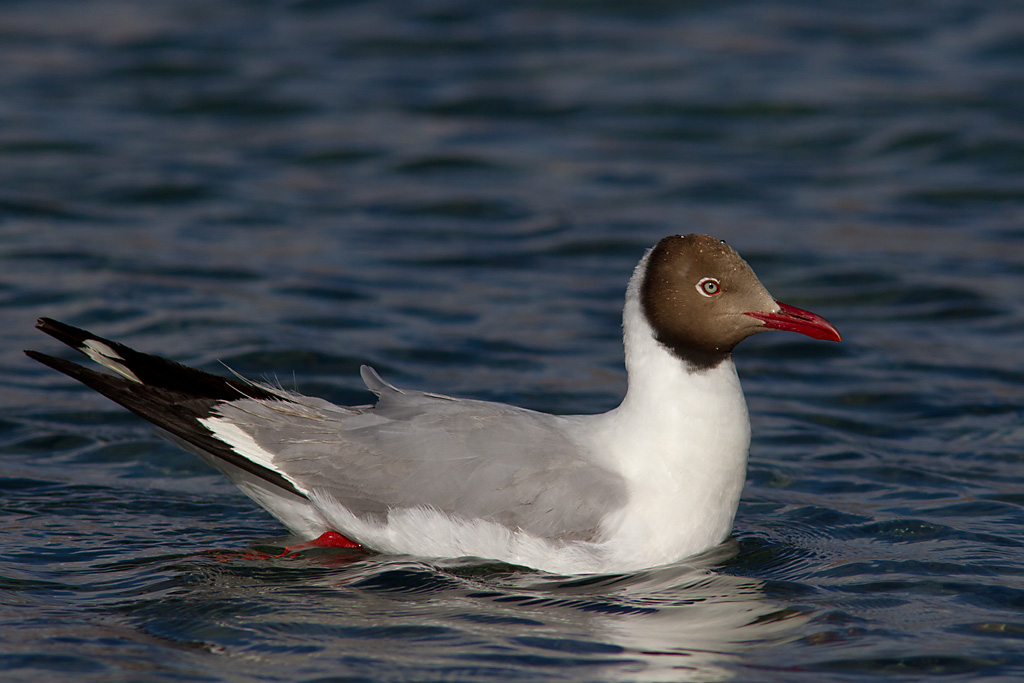
- Breeding adult
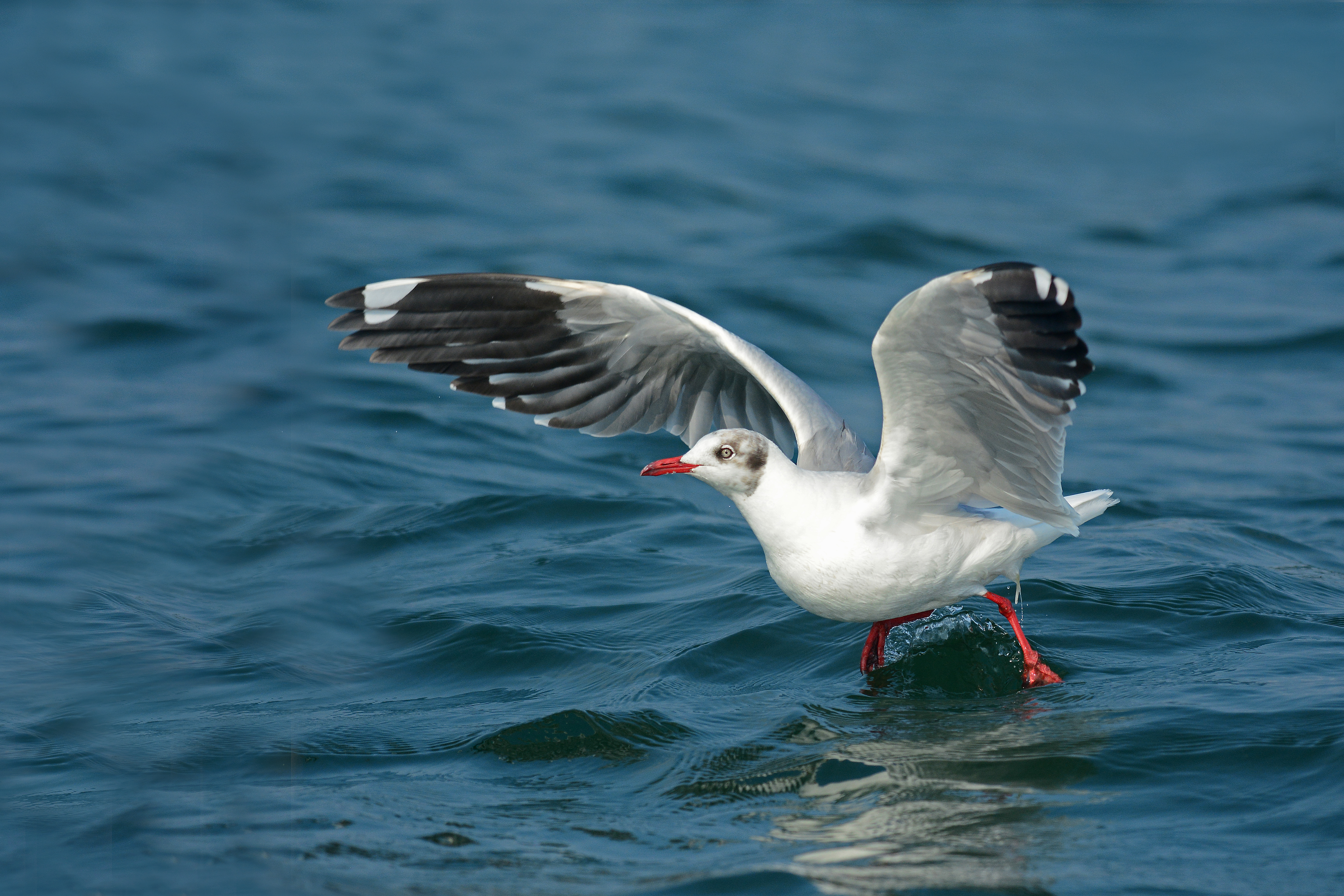
- Non-breeding adult

Conservation status
- Least Concern (IUCN 3.1)

Scientific classification
- Kingdom: Animalia
- Phylum: Chordata
- Class: Aves
- Order: Charadriiformes
- Family: Laridae
- Genus: Chroicocephalus
- Species: C. brunnicephalus

Binomial name
- Chroicocephalus brunnicephalus (Jerdon, 1840) west coast of Indian Peninsula

Synonyms
- Larus brunnicephalus

= Brown-headed gull =

Species of bird

The brown-headed gull (Chroicocephalus brunnicephalus) is a small gull which breeds in the high plateaus of central Asia from Tajikistan to Ordos in Inner Mongolia. It is migratory, wintering on the coasts and large inland lakes of the Indian subcontinent. As is the case with many gulls, was traditionally placed in the genus Larus.

This gull breeds in colonies in large reedbeds or marshes, or on islands in lakes, nesting on the ground. Like most gulls, it is highly gregarious in winter, both when feeding or in evening roosts. It is not a pelagic species, and is rarely seen at sea far from coasts.

This is a bold and opportunist feeder, which will scavenge in towns or take invertebrates in ploughed fields with equal relish.

The brown-headed gull is slightly larger than black-headed gull. The summer adult has a pale brown head, lighter than that of black-headed, a pale grey body, and red bill and legs. The black tips to the primary wing feathers have conspicuous white "mirrors". The underwing is grey with black flight feathers. The brown hood is lost in winter, leaving just dark vertical streaks.

This bird takes two years to reach maturity. First year birds have a black terminal tail band, more dark areas in the wings, and, in summer, a less homogeneous hood.

This is a noisy species, especially at colonies.

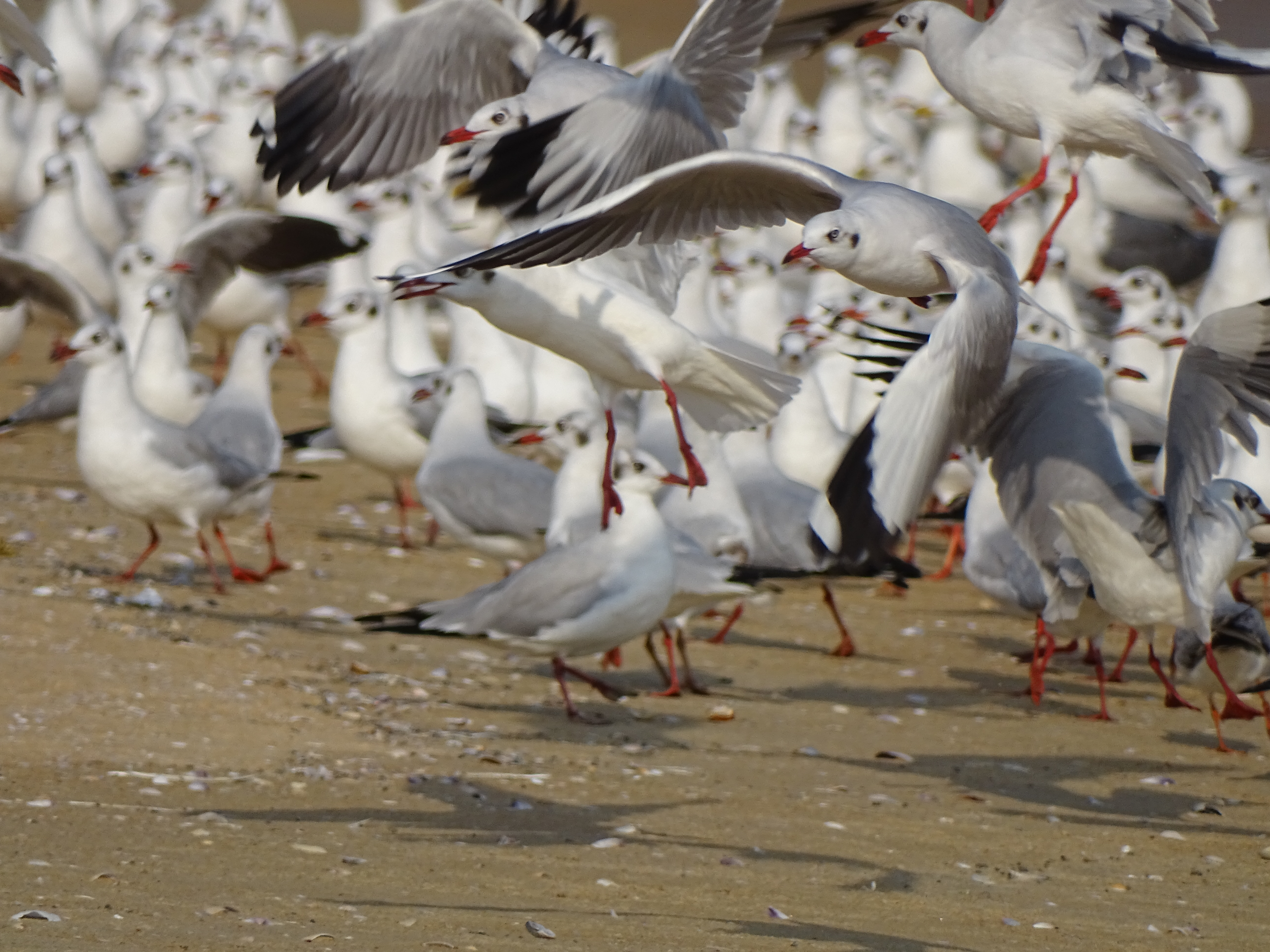
Brown-headed gull in flight - Ezhimala, Kerala

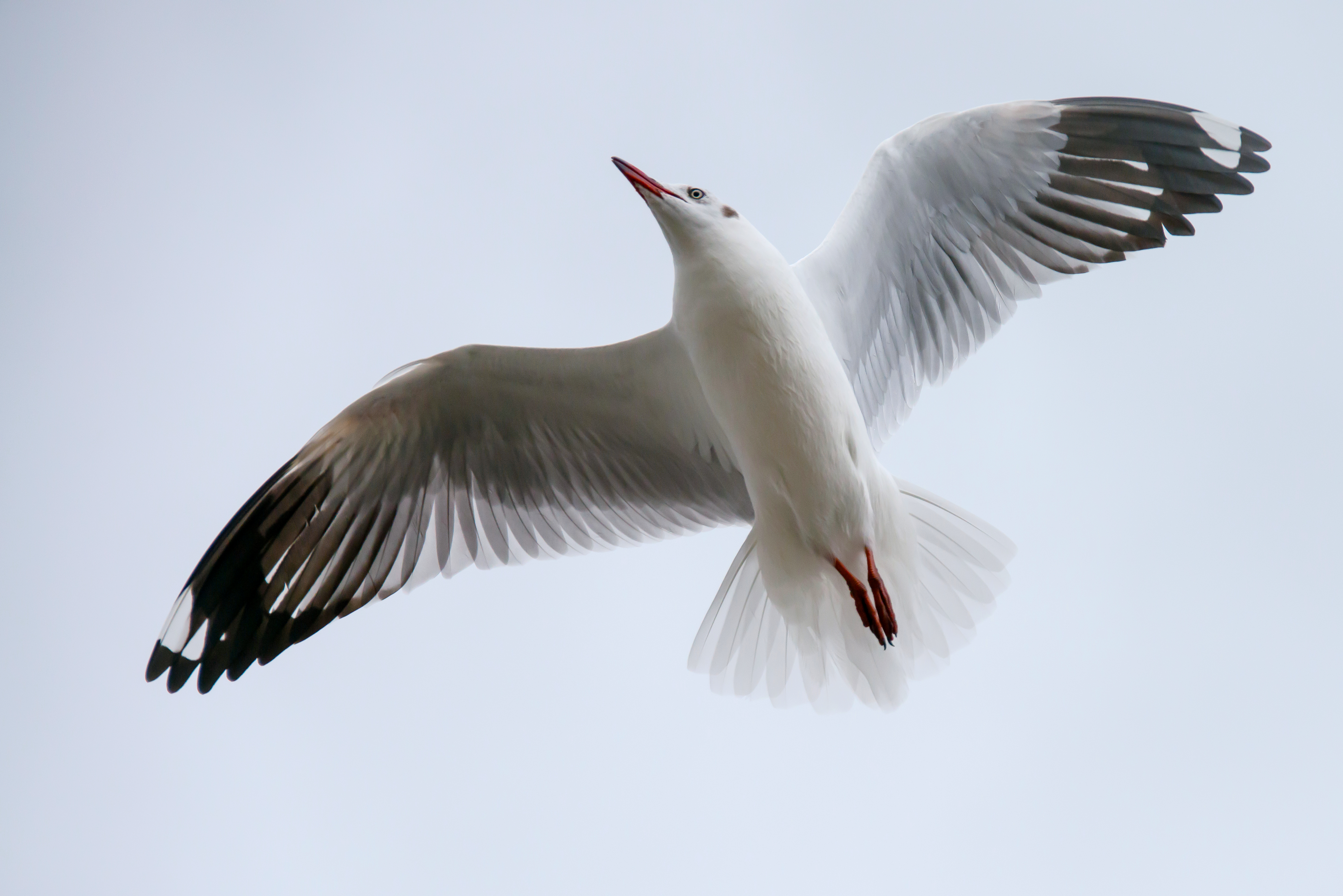
Brown-headed gull in flight - Bang Pu, Samut Prakan, Thailand

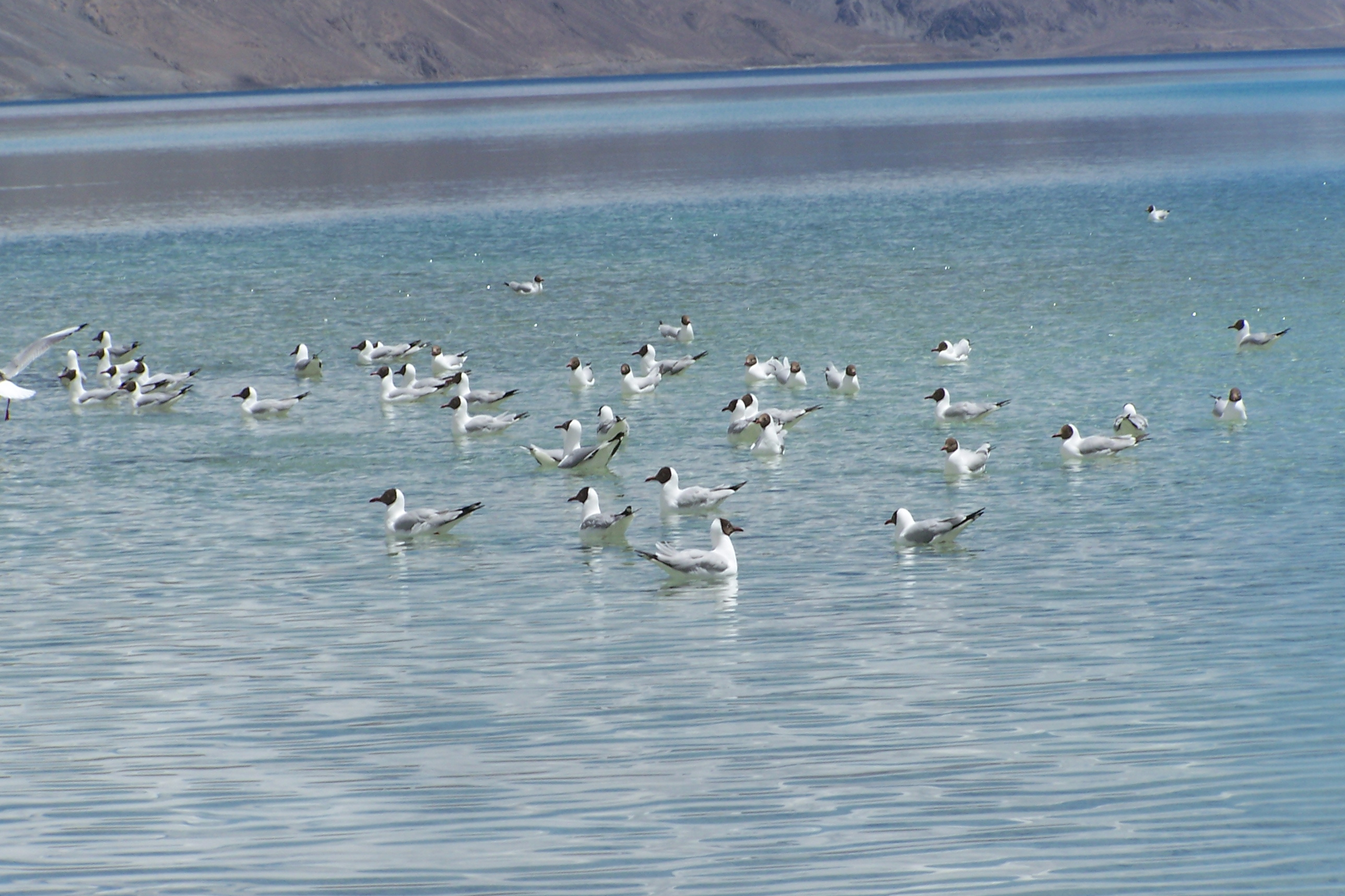
At Pangong Tso

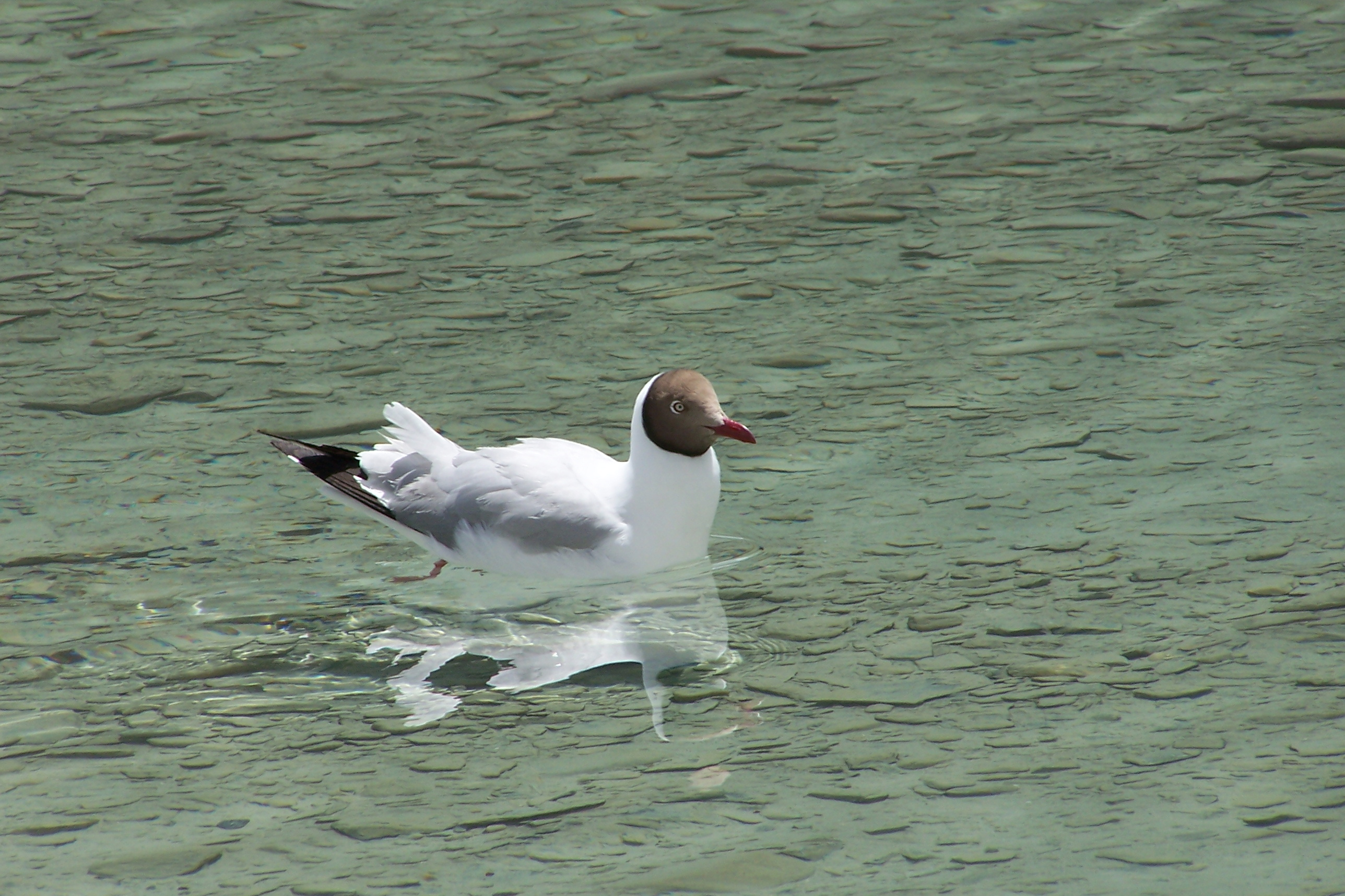
At Pangong Tso

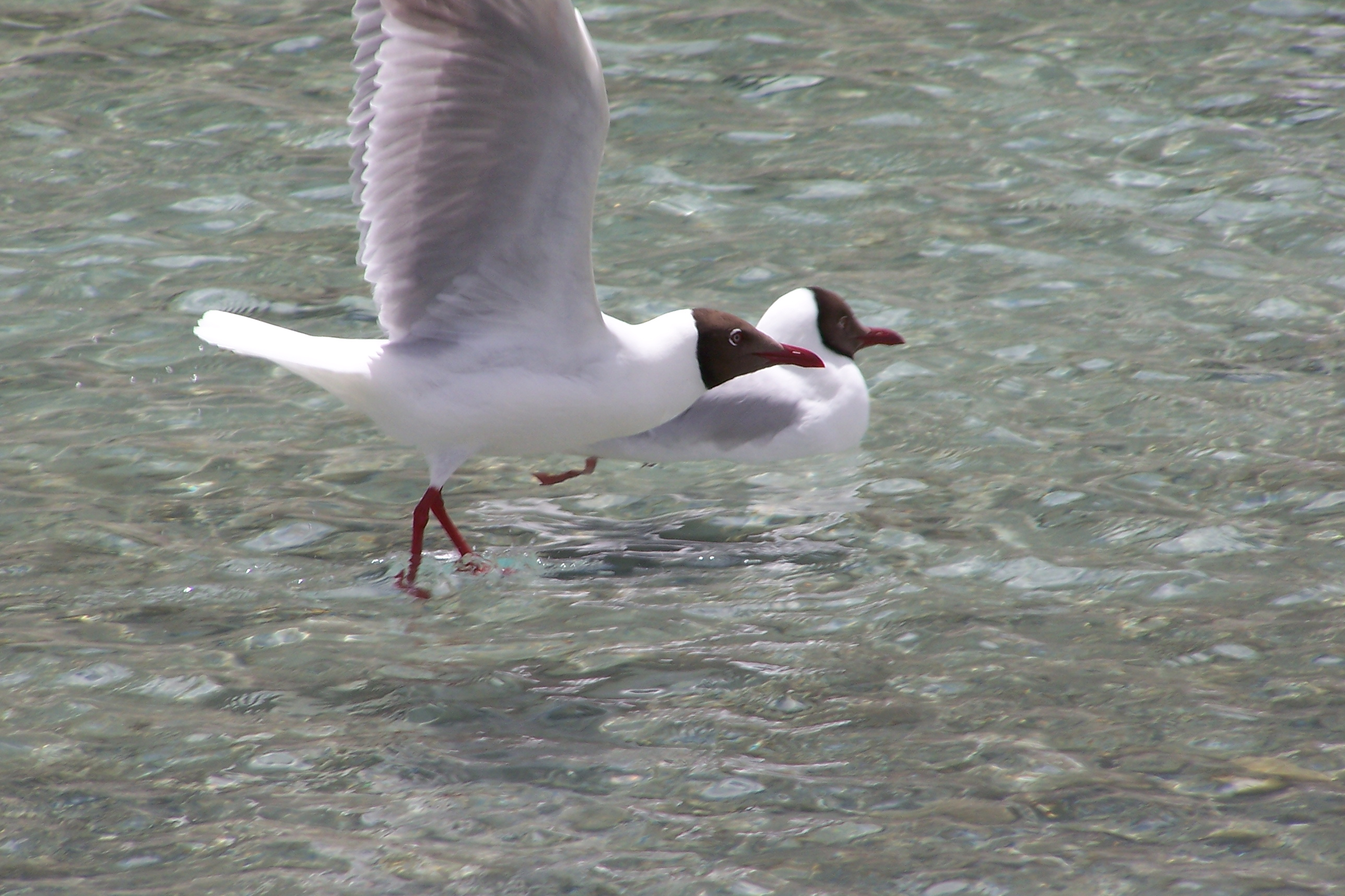
At Pangong Tso

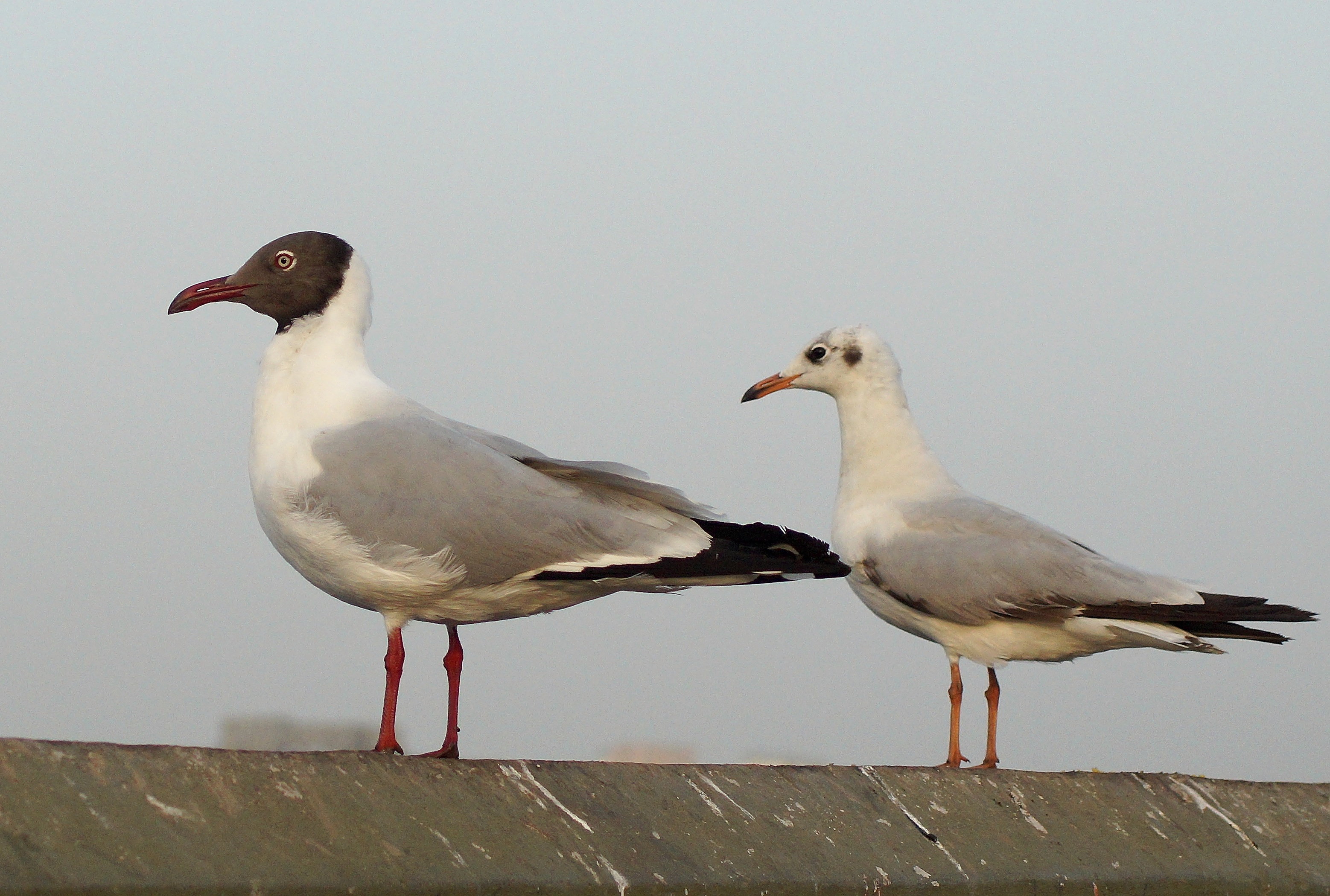
In Western India

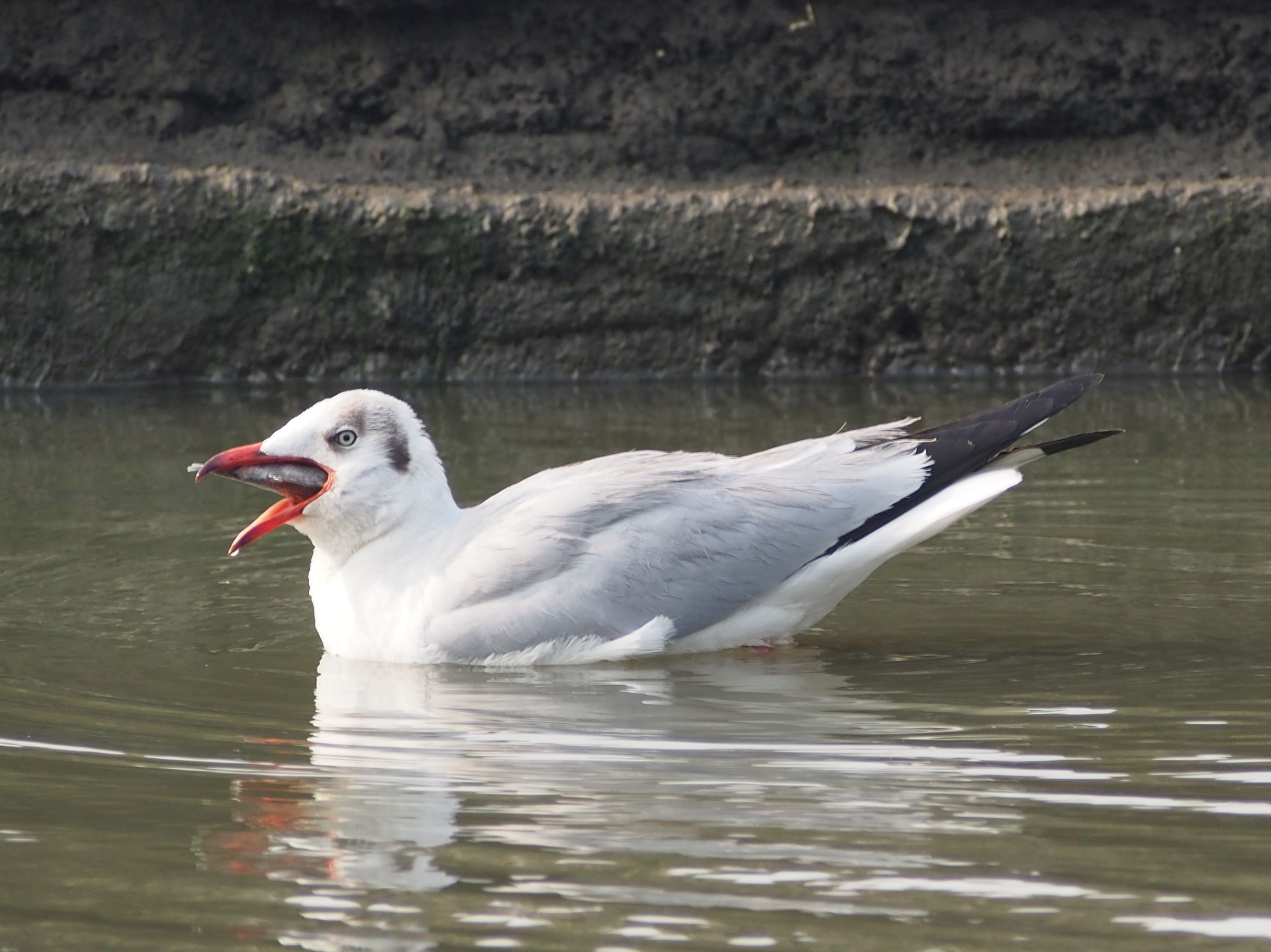
Brown-headed Gull fishing in Navi Mumbai, India

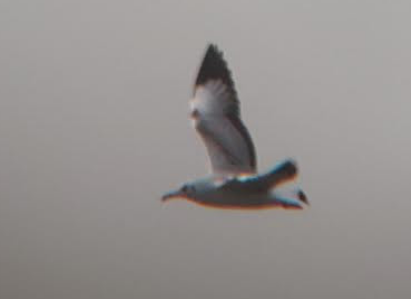
Immature Brown-headed Gull in flight
