= Samutprakarn Crocodile Farm and Zoo =

Crocodile zoo in Samut Prakan, Thailand

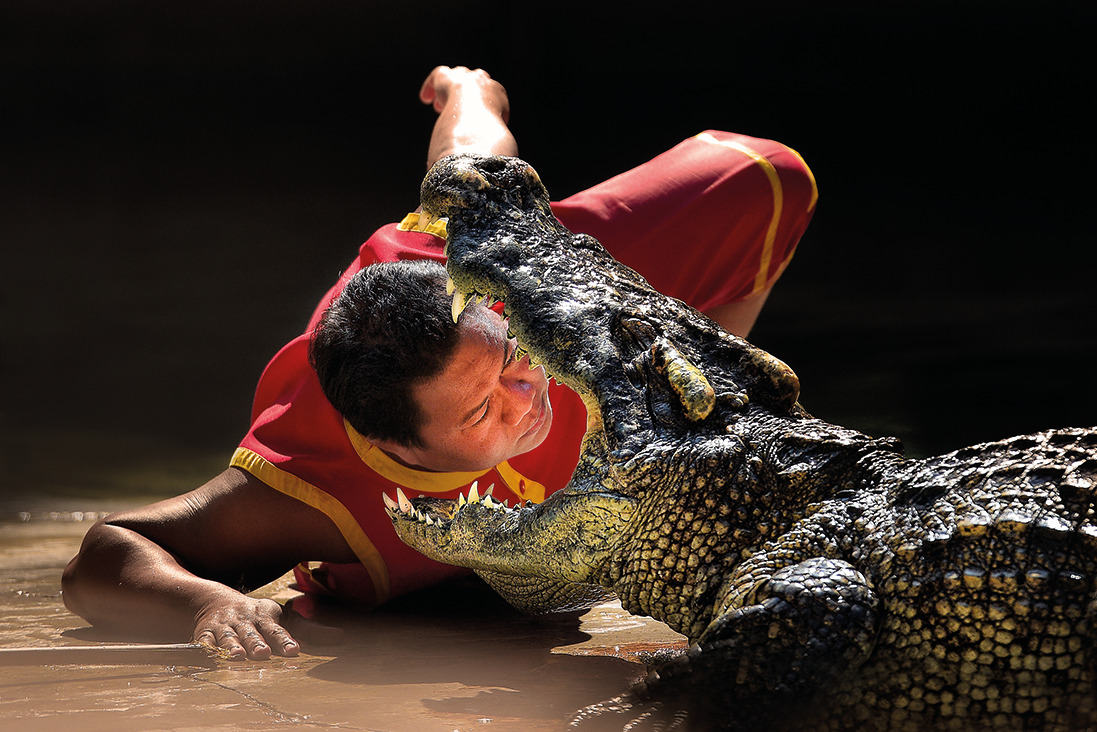
- Crocodile Show
- Interactive map of Samutprakarn Crocodile Farm and Zoo
- 13°34′16″N 100°35′47″E
- Date opened: 1950 (Original); 2024 (Revamped)
- Date closed: 2020 (Original)
- Location: Thai Ban, Samut Prakan Province, Thailand
- Land area: 400 rai
- No. of animals: Crocodiles: 60,000
- No. of species: 27
- Owner: Youngprapakorn family
- Management: Crocodile Farm and Bangpakong Zoo Co., Ltd.
- Public transit: BTS Skytrain: Sai Luat Station, Sukhumvit line); Bus Lines: 102, 142, 508, 511, 535

The Samutprakarn Crocodile Farm and Zoo (Thai: ฟาร์มจระเข้สมุทรปราการ) was a famous crocodile zoo in Samut Prakarn Province, Thailand that operated from 1950 to its temporary closure in 2020. During is tenure, the zoo operated as one of the largest crocodile zoos in the world, being home to 60,000 crocodiles. It even claimed to hold the world's largest crocodile in captivity, named Yai, who measured around 6 m (19 ft 8 in) and weighed 1,114 kg (2,456 lb). The Covid-19 pandemic and the loss of tourists would later cause the zoo's closure in 2020 before going into liquidation in 2021.

In addition to crocodiles, the zoo also housed a wide array of other animals, including Asian elephants, tigers, chimpanzees, gibbons, turtles, snakes, birds, camels, hippos, goats, alpacas, deer, fish, bears, leopards, cows, horses, sheep, boars, ostriches, rabbits, orangutans, peafowl, cassowaries, emus, porcupines and pythons. The area also had an exhibit showcasing models and skeletons of dinosaurs, and also a slide multivision of primitive men and animals. There were daily crocodile shows, famous for the performers who did tricks such as putting their heads and arms inside a crocodile's mouth. Elephant shows displayed the dexterity of elephants as they walked tightropes, rode skateboards and danced. Visitors could also take a short elephant ride, train, or paddle-boat ride.

== Areas ==
=== Crocodile Area ===
This was an area where visitors could feed chicken to crocodiles in a pond. Most of the crocodiles here were larger than the other crocodiles in the zoo. Visitors could either throw chicken into the pond with their hands, or try to lure them with a wooden pole with chicken attached to the end. Another pond featured unique types of crocodiles, including albino, melanisitc and beetle-tailed.

Crocodile shows were also held here, where performers would perform with crocodiles, demonstrating actions such as sticking their head and arms inside a crocodile's mouth.

=== Other Areas ===
There was an area where visitors (particularly children) could interact and feed carrots to farm animals such as goats and alpacas.

== History ==
In 1946, Thailand had some of the largest crocodile populations in the world and people would often use their leather to make bags and purses that they then sold at high prices. This would then inspire Uthai Youngpraphakorn to cultivate crocodiles on a farm. The Samutprakarn Crocodile Farm and Zoo was then established in 1950 by Uthai Youngpraphakorn on an area of 1 rai. This would later expand to its current area of 400 rai. Uthai would later die aged 96 on October 7, 2021.

During the COVID-19 pandemic, tourist numbers in Thailand plummeted as international travel ceased. Along with the rest of the tourism industry, the zoo suffered massive financial losses. On January 26, 2021, it was announced that the company that operated the farm, Bangpakong Crocodile Farm and Zoo Co., Ltd., was going into liquidation. This comes after a civil case where the Youngprapakorn family objected the order in September 2020.

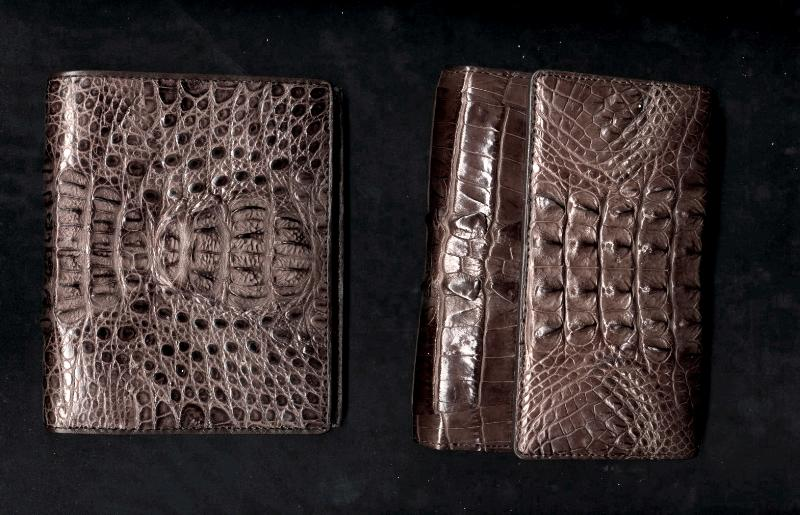
Wallet made from crocodile skin

== Incidents ==
There were at least three suicides at the facility involving women who jumped into a crocodile pond and were eaten alive; there was such an incident in 2002 and a news report from the BBC made reference to a similar occurrence a decade prior to this, and more recently in 2014.

A recent article published in The Washington Post alleged that the animals were exploited at the Samutprakarn Crocodile Farm and Zoo. An article published by National Geographic which reported animal abuse and neglect, in particular concerned an elephant named Gluay Hom.
