= Thai Ban =

Thai Ban ท้ายบ้าน
- Tambon
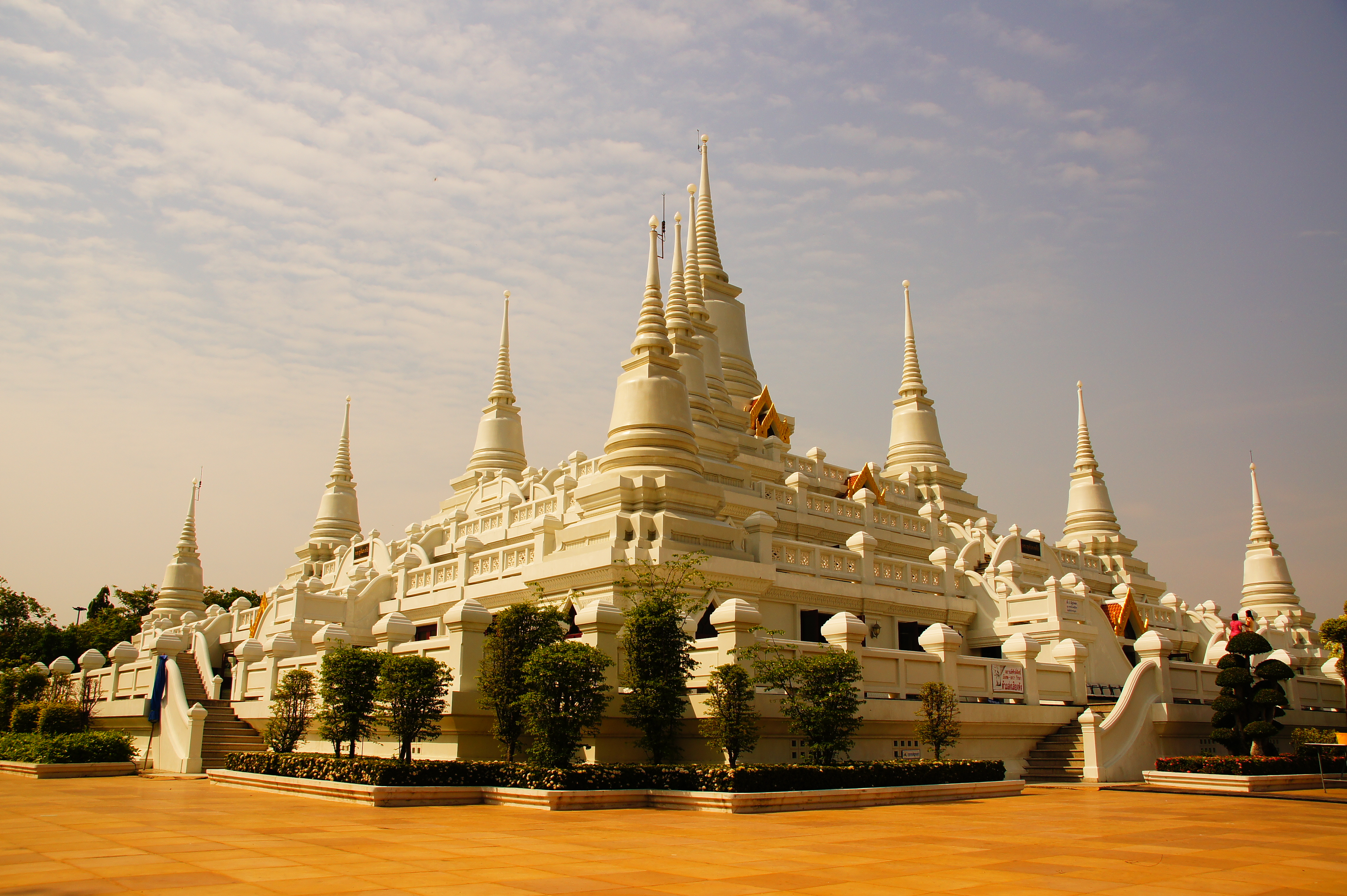
- Wat Asokaram a renowned local Buddhist temple
- Etymology: "the end of the village"
- Location in Bangkok Metropolitan Region
- Coordinates: 13°33′10.4″N 100°35′20.0″E
- Country: Thailand
- Province: Samut Prakan
- District: Mueang Samut Prakan

Population (April 30, 2022)
  - Total: 24,350
- Time zone: UTC+7 (ICT)
- Postcode: 10280
- Area code: (+66) 02

Thai Ban (Thai: ท้ายบ้าน, pronounced [tʰáːj bâːn]) is a tambon (sub-district) in Mueang Samut Prakan District, Samut Prakan Province.

== Toponymy ==
Its name "Thai Ban" literally translates to "the end of the muban (village)". Because during the reign of King Chulalongkorn (Rama V), it was considered a very distant area from the downtown Samut Prakan, also colloquially known as Pak Nam. At that time it was called "Thai Ban Talat" (the end of the marketplace), later called "Thai Ban" for short.

== Geography ==
Adjacent areas are, clockwise from north, Pak Nam, Thai Ban Mai, Bang Pu Mai, all of them are in its district, and Laem Fa Pha in Phra Samut Chedi District (across Chao Phraya River). It borders Bay of Bangkok (upper Gulf of Thailand) to the south.

== Administration ==
=== Central administration ===
The entire area is under the administration of Bang Pu Sub-District Municipality.

=== Local administration ===
Thai Ban is divided into seven administrative villages.

== Population ==
As of April 30, 2022, it had a total population of 24,350 people (11,866 males, 12,484 females) in 11,415 households.

== Places ==
- Wat Asokaram
- Wat Rat Pho Thong
- Wat Thong Kong
- Hadamara Aksornlak Wittaya School
- Taurak Kindergarten
- Thai Ban Health Promoting Hospital
- Ammara Beach Roundabout

=== Neighbouring places ===
- Bang Pu Recreation Center
- Bangpoo Industrial Estate
- Kheha BTS Station (E23)
