= Phraekkasa =

Phraekkasa แพรกษา
- Tambon
- Phraekkasa
- Location in Bangkok Metropolitan Region
- Coordinates: 13°34′50.5″N 100°39′06.5″E
- Country: Thailand
- Province: Samut Prakan
- District: Mueang Samut Prakan

Population (2020)
  - Total: 62,453
- Time zone: UTC+7 (ICT)
- Postcode: 10280
- Area code: (+66) 02
- Geocode: 110110

Phraekkasa (Thai: แพรกษา, pronounced [pʰrɛ̂ːk.kā.sǎː], also colloquially known as Phraek Sa, pronounced [pʰrɛ̂ːk.sǎː]) is a tambon (sub-district) and neighbourhood in the area of Mueang Samut Prakan district, Samut Prakan province on eastern outskirts Bangkok.

== History & toponymy ==
The area dates back to the late Ayutthaya era, the first people who migrated to settle at Phraekkasa. They are Mon people from Pathum Thani and Pak Lat (now Phra Pradaeng). They set up houses along the Khlong Phraekkasa canal. At that time, the vicinity was still a mangrove forest.

Originally, the area was referred to as Phraek Ta Sa (แพรกตาสา, pronounced [pʰrɛ̂ːk.tāː.sǎː]). Later on, it was corrupted into Phraekkasa like today.

== Geography ==
Phraekkasa is the eastern part of Mueang Samut Prakan, the capital district of the province. Its adjacent areas, clockwise from north, are Bang Mueang and Phraekkasa Mai, Bang Pu Mai, and Thai Ban Mai. It all belongs on Mueang Samut Prakan.

== Administration ==
It is under the administration of two local government bodies: Phraekkasa Town Municipality, and Phraekkasa Sub-District Municipality.

It is also divided into seven administrative muban (village)

No.	Name	Thai
1.	Ban Khlong Na	บ้านคลองนา
2.	Ban Khlong Lao Mu	บ้านคลองเล้าหมู
3.	Ban Phuttharaksa	บ้านพุทธรักษา
4.	Ban Khlong Hok Suan, Ban Phraek Chom Thong	บ้านคลองหกส่วน, บ้านแพรกจอมทอง
5.	Ban Khlong Khwang	บ้านคลองขวาง
6.	Ban Khlong Som Prasong, Ban Khlong Prasong	บ้านคลองสมประสงค์, บ้านคลองประสงค์
7.	Ban Sut Chai	บ้านสุดใจ

== Economy ==
Phraekkasa is an industrial zone. There are many industrial estates in the area.

== Transportation ==
The area is served by nearby the Phraek Sa Station (E21) of the BTS skytrain, whose Sukhumvit Line runs above Sukhumvit Road (Highway 3).

It is also crossed by Phraekkasa Road (Rural Route 16-001).
