= Pak Nam Samut Prakan =

Pak Nam Samut Prakan ปากน้ำสมุทรปราการ
- Town Municipality
- Location in Bangkok Metropolitan Region
- Coordinates: 13°35′23″N 100°38′19″E
- Country: Thailand
- Province: Samut Prakan
- District: Mueang Samut Prakan

Population (2017)
  - Total: 31,887
- Time zone: UTC+7 (ICT)
- Area code: (+66) 34

Pak Nam Samut Prakan (Thai: ปากน้ำสมุทรปราการ) is a town (Thesaban Mueang) in the Mueang Samut Prakan District (Amphoe) of Samut Prakan Province in the Bangkok Metropolitan Region of Central Thailand. In 2017, it had a total population of 31,887 people.
