= Bang Pu =

Seaside resort in Thailand

Coordinates: 13°30′17.3478″N 100°43′48.1362″E

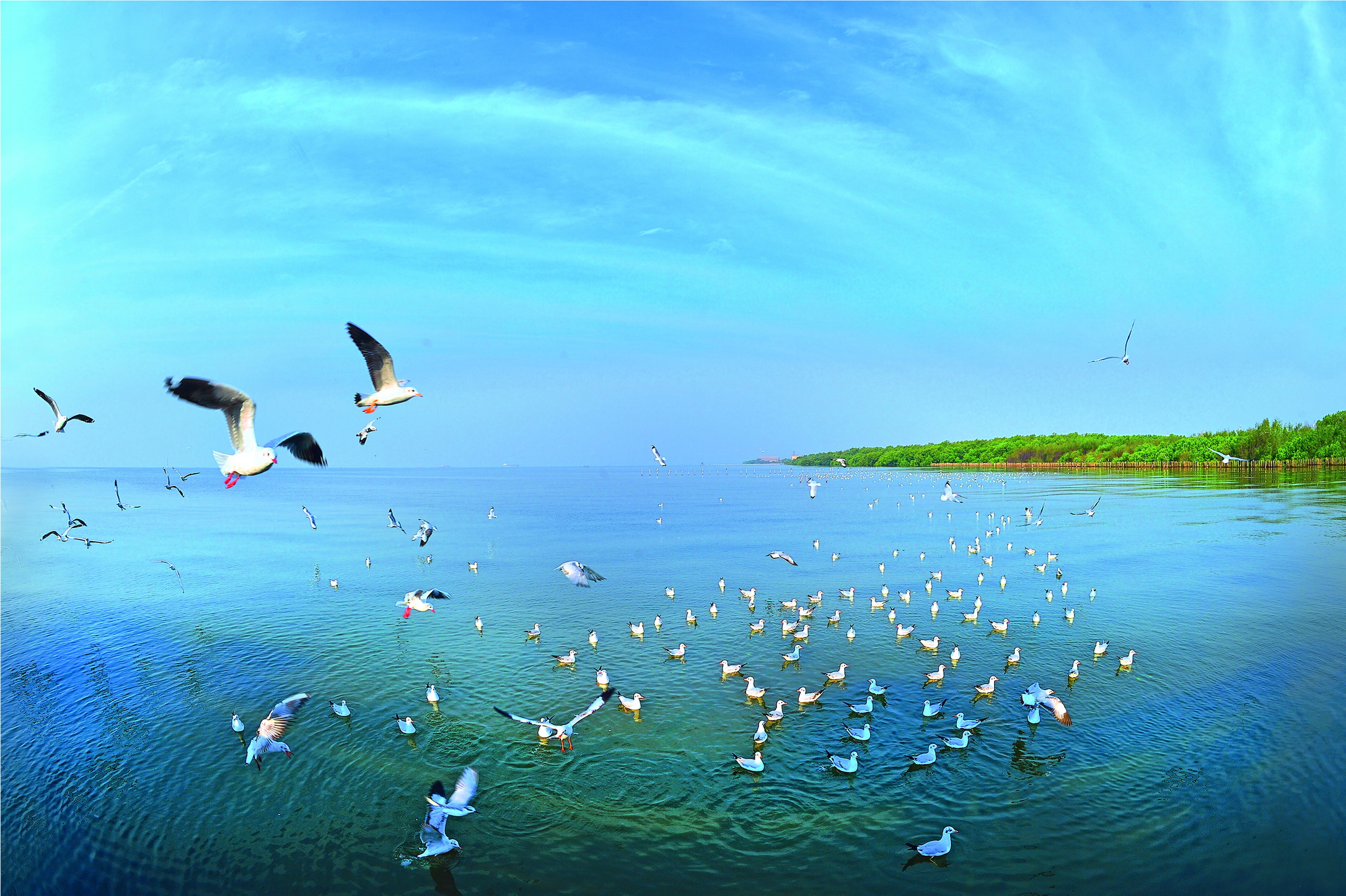
Seagulls, Bang Pu

Bang Pu (Thai: บางปู, pronounced [bāːŋ pūː]), also known as Bang Pu Recreation Center (สถานตากอากาศบางปู) is a seaside resort on the Bay of Bangkok (upper Gulf of Thailand) belonging to Mueang Samut Prakan District, Samut Prakan Province, central Thailand.

Bang Pu, literally 'place of crabs', was established in accordance with the ideas of Field Marshal Plaek Pibulsongkram while serving as Prime Minister in 1937 to be a place of recreation for people in that era. It occupies an area of 369 rai (about 252 acres). At present, it has been maintained by the Quartermaster Department Royal Thai Army.

It gained great popularity among people especially young people in the 1950s–1960s, as it is the closest seaside to Bangkok. It is mentioned in the dialogue of the 1997 film Dang Bireley's and Young Gangsters as a place where Dang's girlfriend wants to go on a trip.

A Bang Pu landmark is Saphan Suk Ta (สะพานสุขตา), a pier extending into the sea. At its end is a restaurant called Sala Sukjai (ศาลาสุขใจ) where dances are held every Saturday evening.

Bang Pu provides habitat for large flocks of migratory seagulls that migrate from Siberia annually in the early winter (around beginning of November).
