= Mueang Samut Prakan district =

Mueang Samut Prakan district อำเภอเมืองสมุทรปราการ
- District
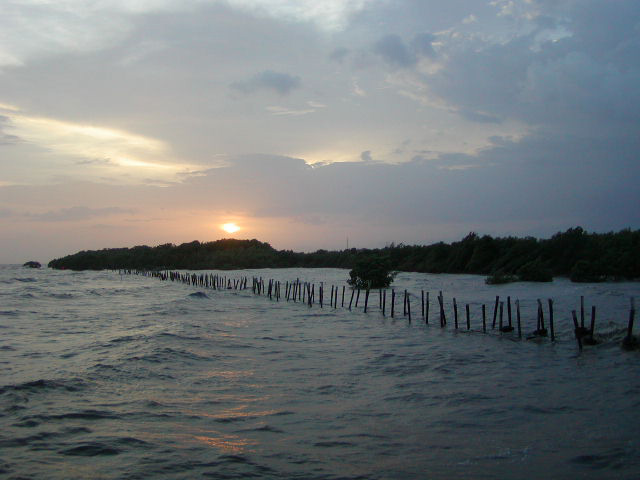
- Bang Pu mangrove in 2002

- District location in Samut Prakan province

- Location in the Bangkok Metropolitan Region Location in Thailand
- Coordinates: 13°36′2″N 100°35′48″E
- Country: Thailand
- Province: Samut Prakan
- Seat: Pak Nam

Area
  - Mueang district: 190.56 km^{2} (73.58 sq mi)

Population (2018)
  - Mueang district: 540,979
  - Density: 2,819.73/km^{2} (7,303.1/sq mi)
  - City Municipality: 51,495
- Time zone: UTC+07:00 (ICT)
- Postal code: 10270
- Geocode: 1101

Mueang Samut Prakan district (Thai: อำเภอเมืองสมุทรปราการ, pronounced [mɯ̄aŋ sā.mùt prāː.kāːn]) or colloquially known as Paknam Samut Prakan (Thai: ปากน้ำสมุทรปราการ) is the capital district (amphoe mueang) of Samut Prakan province in central Thailand. It has the highest population of all districts in the country.

== Administration ==
=== Central administration ===
Mueang Samut Prakan is divided into 13 subdistricts (tambon), which are further subdivided into 35 administrative villages (muban).

No.	Name	Thai	Villages	Pop.
1.	Pak Nam	ปากน้ำ	–	51,495
2.	Samrong Nuea	สำโรงเหนือ	–	72,495
3.	Bang Mueang	บางเมือง	–	68,362
4.	Thai Ban	ท้ายบ้าน	–	25,559
5.	Bang Pu Mai	บางปูใหม่	–	39,435
6.	Phraek Sa	แพรกษา	7	60,549
7.	Bang Prong	บางโปรง	4	10,239
8.	Bang Pu	บางปู	–	6,729
9.	Bang Duan	บางด้วน	8	7,992
10.	Bang Mueang Mai	บางเมืองใหม่	–	51,980
11.	Thepharak	เทพารักษ์	9	49,599
12.	Thai Ban Mai	ท้ายบ้านใหม่	–	48,037
13.	Phraek Sa Mai	แพรกษาใหม่	7	48,508

Missing numbers are tambons split off at the creation of Phra Samut Chedi district.

=== Local administration ===
There is one city (thesaban nakhon) in the district:

- Samut Prakan (Thai: เทศบาลนครสมุทรปราการ) consisting of subdistrict Pak Nam.

There are two towns (thesaban mueang) in the district:

- Pak Nam Samut Prakan (Thai: เทศบาลเมืองปากน้ำสมุทรปราการ) consisting of parts of subdistrict Bang Mueang.
- Phraek Sa Mai (Thai: เทศบาลเมืองแพรกษาใหม่) consisting of parts of subdistrict Phraek Sa Mai.

There are five subdistrict municipalities (thesaban tambon) in the district:

- Samrong Nuea (Thai: เทศบาลตำบลสำโรงเหนือ) consisting of parts of subdistricts Samrong Nuea, Bang Mueang Mai, Thepharak.
- Dan Samrong (Thai: เทศบาลตำบลด่านสำโรง) consisting of parts of subdistrict Samrong Nuea.
- Bang Mueang (Thai: เทศบาลตำบลบางเมือง) consisting of parts of subdistricts Bang Mueang, Bang Mueang Mai, Thepharak.
- Phraek Sa (Thai: เทศบาลตำบลแพรกษา) consisting of parts of subdistricts Phraek Sa, Thepharak, Phraek Sa Mai.
- Bang Pu (Thai: เทศบาลตำบลบางปู) consisting of subdistricts Thai Ban, Bang Pu Mai, Bang Pu, Thai Ban Mai.

There are four subdistrict administrative organizations (SAO) in the district:

- Phraek Sa (Thai: องค์การบริหารส่วนตำบลแพรกษา) consisting of parts of subdistrict Phraek Sa.
- Bang Prong (Thai: องค์การบริหารส่วนตำบลบางโปรง) consisting of subdistrict Bang Prong.
- Bang Duan (Thai: องค์การบริหารส่วนตำบลบางด้วน) consisting of subdistrict Bang Duan.
- Thepharak (Thai: องค์การบริหารส่วนตำบลเทพารักษ์) consisting of parts of subdistrict Thepharak.

== Economy ==
Interhides Public Company (IHL) operates nine tanning factories in Bang Pu Mai and is building a tenth factory there to be operational by 2020. IHL produce finished leathers for international footwear, automotive, and furniture companies.

== Environment ==
The district's coastline has seen severe erosion since the 1990s. Coastal mangrove forests were destroyed and replaced with shrimp farms. Three to five metres of shoreline has been submerged every year since then, resulting in the loss of 4,000 rai of land to the sea.

Thailand lost almost one third of its coastal mangrove forests between 1961 and 2000. According to Thailand's Department of Marine and Coastal Resources, a quarter of the country's shores—about 700 kilometres (500 miles)—are eroding, some "severely".

== Transportation ==
Samut Prakan is served by the southern end of the Sukhumvit Line on the BTS Skytrain (from Samrong to Kheha stations). The major thoroughfare in Samut Prakan is Sukhumvit Road, which links the city to Central Bangkok all the way towards the Cambodian border in Trat.

== Education ==
The Thai Sikh International School is in Samrong, in the district.

== Health ==
Samut Prakan Hospital, the main hospital of the province is located in the district.
