= Common rattlesnake =

Common rattlesnake may refer to:

- Crotalus adamanteus, or eastern diamondback rattlesnake, a venomous pit viper species found in the southeastern United States
- Crotalus horridus, or timber rattlesnake, a venomous pit viper species found in the eastern United States
- Crotalus viridis, or prairie rattlesnake, a venomous pit viper species native to the western United States, southwestern Canada, and northern Mexico
