= St. Augustine Alligator Farm Zoological Park =

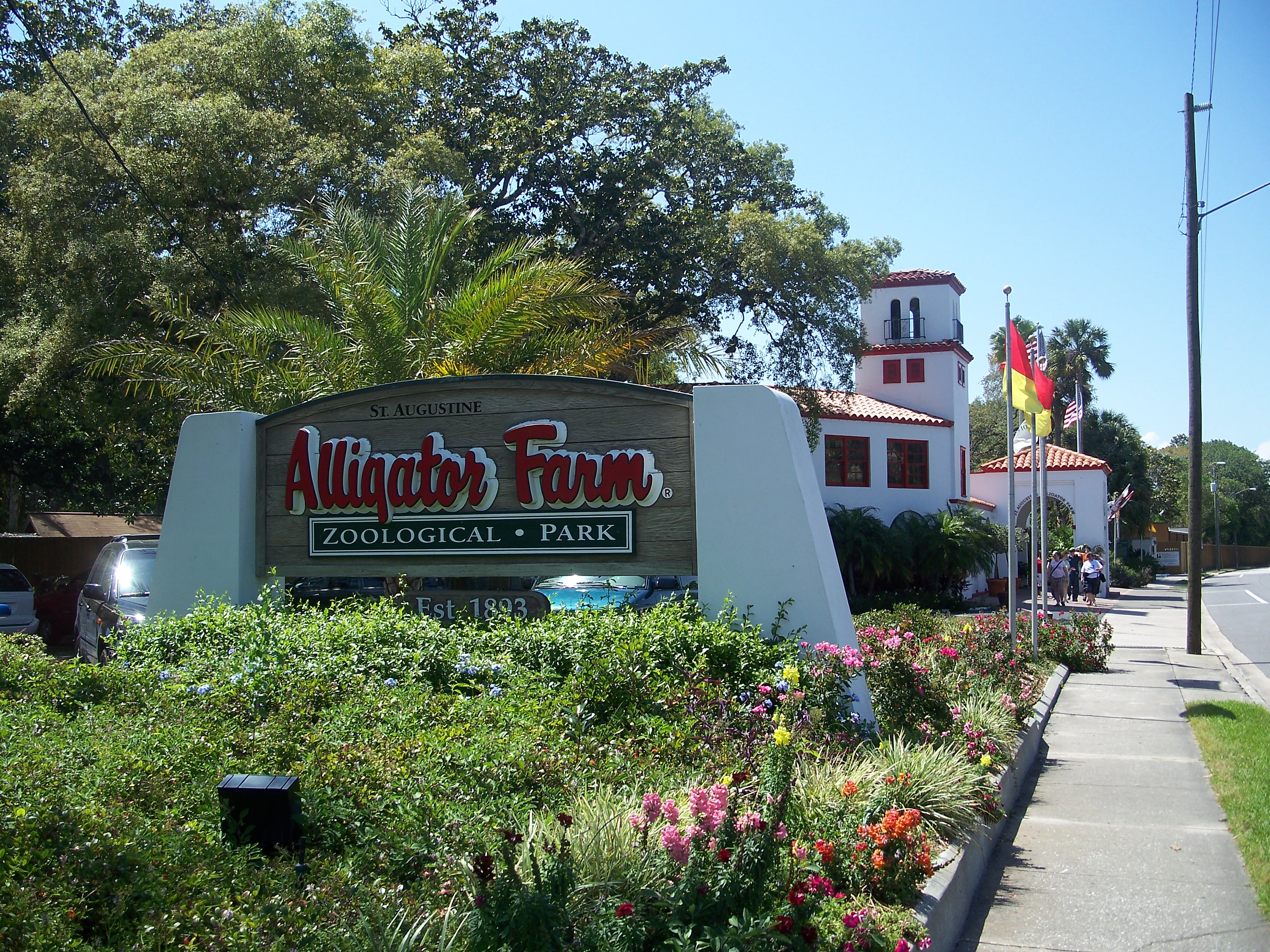
- Interactive map of St. Augustine Alligator Farm Zoological Park
- Date opened: May 20, 1893
- Location: St. Augustine, Florida, United States
- Land area: more than 7 acres (28,000 m^{2})
- Memberships: AZA
- Website: www.alligatorfarm.com
- St. Augustine Alligator Farm Historic District
- U.S. National Register of Historic Places
- U.S. Historic district
- Location within Florida Location within the United States
- Location: St. Johns County, Florida
- Coordinates: 29°52′53″N 81°17′18″W
- Built: 1937
- NRHP reference No.: 92001232
- Added to NRHP: September 10, 1992

The St. Augustine Alligator Farm Zoological Park is one of Florida's oldest continuously running attractions, having opened on May 20, 1893. It has 24 species of crocodilians, and also a variety of other reptiles, mammals and birds, as well as exhibits, animal performances and educational demonstrations.

== History ==
The park began in 1893 on St. Augustine Beach as a minor attraction at the end of a railway running through neighboring Anastasia Island. The alligators were added at first to get visitors to buy souvenirs and see the museum there. Soon, the reptiles themselves became the main point of interest.

Growing in popularity, the park moved to its current location in the early 1920s. The park changed owners in the 1930s, and, after a devastating fire, they started reconstruction and expansion of the facilities. In 1993, for their 100-year anniversary, the park became the first place in the world to display every species of crocodilian.

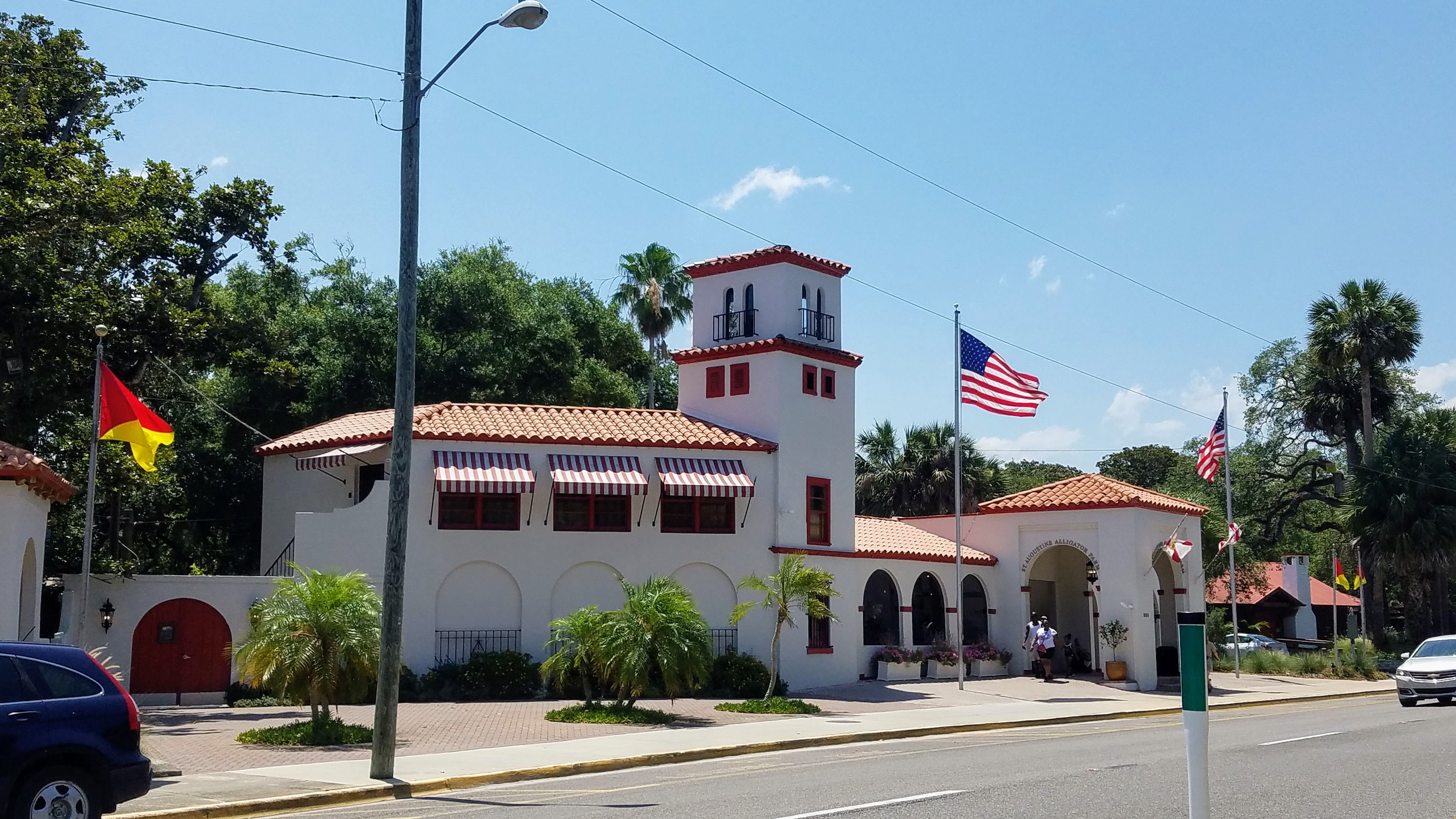
From FL-A1A in 2019

In 2008, the zoo opened a new Komodo dragon facility that also exhibits lizards and snakes found within Southeast Asia.

=== National historic status ===
On September 10, 1992, the Alligator Farm was designated a U.S. Historic District. As such, it was referred to as the St. Augustine Alligator Farm Historic District. According to the National Register of Historic Places, it covers less than 1 acre (4,000 m^{2}), and contains one building and one structure.

== Collection ==
Historically, the Alligator Farm was one of the first institutions where one can see every species of alligator, crocodile, caiman, and gharial. Over the years, the zoo has expanded their collection to include mammals, birds, and other reptiles.

The farm is also home to Chance the Snapper, an American alligator.

List of animals

Mammals

- Bearded emperor tamarin
- Black-and-white ruffed lemur
- Cotton-top tamarin
- Hoffmann's two-toed sloth
- Red ruffed lemur
- Red-rumped agouti
- Ring-tailed lemur

Birds

- Bahama pintail
- Bali myna
- Black crowned crane
- Blue-and-gold macaw
- Blue-billed curassow
- Bornean crested fireback
- Cabot's tragopan
- Cape vulture
- Coscoroba swan
- Edwards's pheasant
- Golden conure
- Hooded vulture
- Keel-billed toucan
- Laughing kookaburra
- Mallard
- Marabou stork
- Scarlet macaw
- Redhead
- Ruddy duck
- Southern cassowary
- Sunbittern
- Von der Decken's hornbill
- White-crested laughingthrush
- White-headed vulture
- Wood duck

Reptiles (crocodilians)

- American alligator (both normal and albino)
- American crocodile
- Black caiman
- Broad-snouted caiman
- Chinese alligator
- Cuban crocodile
- Cuvier's dwarf caiman
- Dwarf crocodile
- Freshwater crocodile
- Gharial
- Hall's crocodile
- Morelet's crocodile
- Mugger crocodile
- Nile crocodile
- Orinoco crocodile
- Philippine crocodile
- Saltwater crocodile
- Siamese crocodile
- Smooth-fronted caiman
- Spectacled caiman
- Tomistoma
- West African crocodile
- West African slender-snouted crocodile
- Yacare caiman

Reptiles (other)

- Alligator snapping turtle
- Arrau river turtle
- Asian mountain tortoise
- Big-headed turtle
- Blood python
- Carpet python
- Chicken turtle
- Corn snake
- Eastern diamondback rattlesnake
- Eastern indigo snake
- Eastern rat snake
- Emerald tree skink
- Florida box turtle
- Florida cooter
- Florida cottonmouth
- Florida red-bellied turtle
- Gopher tortoise
- Green tree python
- Komodo dragon
- Galapagos giant tortoise
- Macquarie river turtle
- Malaysian giant turtle
- Mangrove snake
- McGregor's pit viper
- New Caledonian giant gecko
- Northern white-lipped python
- Pygmy rattlesnake
- Radiated tortoise
- Red-tailed rat snake
- Reeves' turtle
- Reticulated python
- Tokay gecko
- Southeast Asian box turtle
- Timor python
- Wood turtle
- Yellow-bellied slider
- Yellow-footed tortoise
- Yellow-spotted river turtle

== Rookery ==
The back section of the park contains a large bird rookery, where free-roaming local bird species such as egrets, herons, wood storks and roseate spoonbills nest and rear their young.

== Affiliations ==
The park is a member of the Association of Zoos and Aquariums (AZA) and the Florida Attraction Association.

== See also ==
- Alligator farm
- Gomek
