= Water rattlesnake =

Water rattlesnake may refer to:

- Crotalus adamanteus, a.k.a. the eastern diamondback rattlesnake, a venomous pitviper species found in the southeastern United States
- Agkistrodon piscivorus, a.k.a. the cottonmouth, a venomous pitviper species found in the eastern United States
