= Chance the Snapper =

Alligator

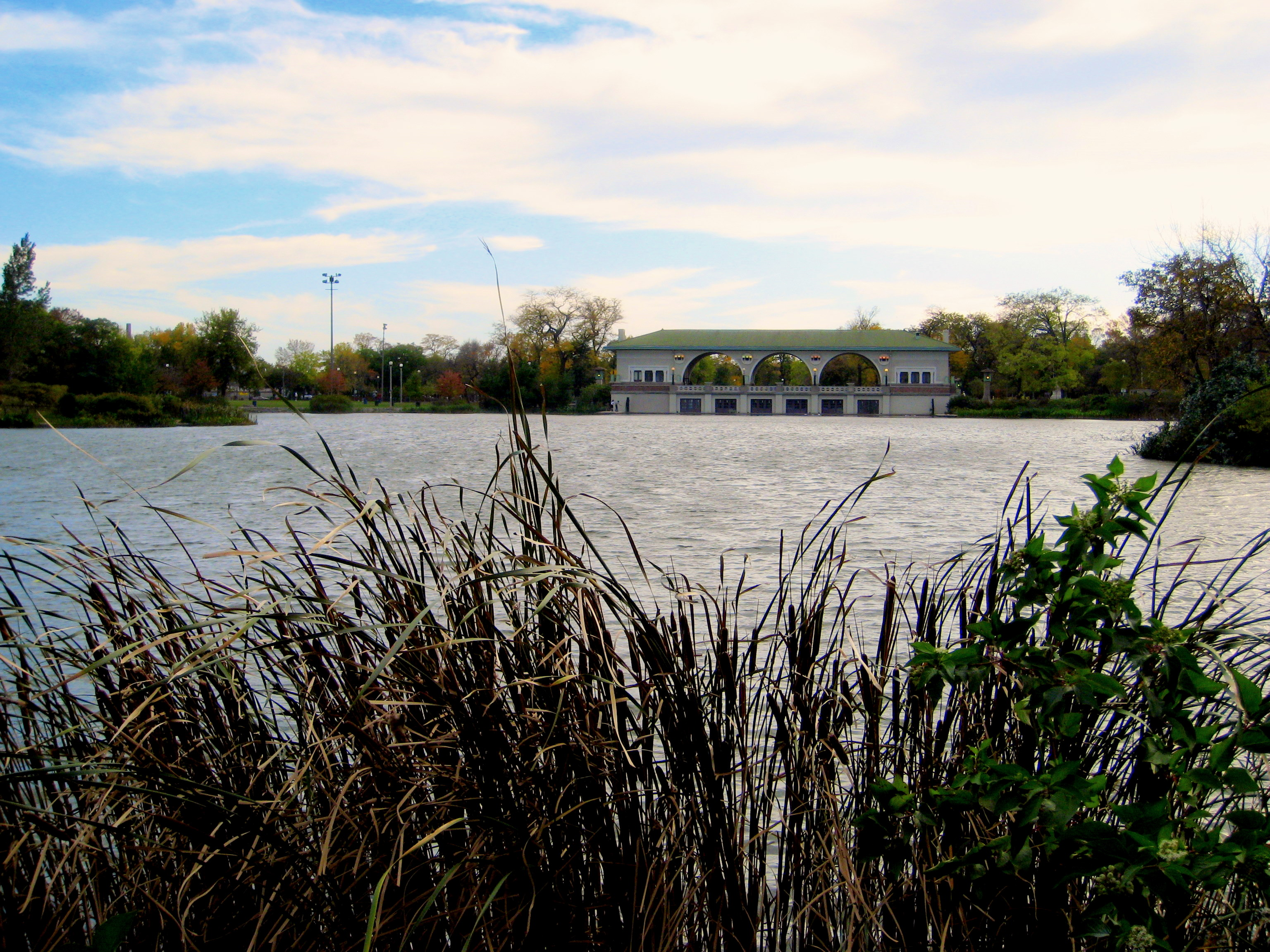
Humboldt Park lagoon, where Chance the Snapper was found

Chance the Snapper is a four to five foot long American alligator that was found swimming in the Humboldt Park lagoon, in Chicago, Illinois, on the evening of July 9, 2019. The animal was named after Chance the Rapper in an online poll conducted by the Block Club Chicago news website, beating other suggested nicknames such as Ruth Gator Ginsberg, Croc Obama, and Frank Lloyd Bite. The alligator inspired several social media accounts, and was the subject of national news coverage.

Experts have stated that the Humboldt Park alligator was likely an illegal pet before being released into the lagoon, and that it would not survive low temperatures in winter if it was not removed. The alligator was considered to be a possible danger, and signs were put up to warn visitors. After more than two days without a sighting, Chance was spotted alive at 1:30 p.m. on July 13 by a Humboldt Park resident. Chance the Snapper was under the watch of Chicago Herpetological Society's "Alligator Bob", who on July 14 stated that the creature was "getting comfortable" in the lagoon and had continued to move further into the water, as well as resisting food, perhaps indicating that he had found a steady food supply. On Sunday, July 14 the city hired Frank Robb, an "alligator trapping agent" and owner of EEARSS.ORG in Cocoa, Florida, to catch the gator after he was recommended by local experts there. At Robb's suggestion, a large part of the park was closed off, to keep people away from the gator in hopes that it would feel less of a need to hide. Chance the Snapper was caught by Robb early Tuesday morning, July 16, 2019. The reptile was found to be a male and in good health. The alligator was given over to Chicago Animal Care and Control, who sent him to live at the St. Augustine Alligator Farm Zoological Park, in St. Augustine, Florida due to no Chicago parks being interested.

When Chance was captured, the Chicago Tribune reported that he was 5 feet 3 inches (1.60 meters) long and weighed about 30 or 40 pounds (14 or 18 kilograms). Upon his arrival in Florida, the St. Augustine Record reported that he was 4 feet (1.2 meters) long and weighed 18 pounds (8.2 kilograms). A veterinarian at the St. Augustine Alligator Farm estimated the alligator's age at 4 to 6 years.

After he captured the alligator, Robb was honored by the Chicago Cubs by being asked to throw out the first pitch at Wrigley Field for their July 16 night game against the Cincinnati Reds. He was also asked to turn on Buckingham Fountain in Grant Park the following day.

The alligator inspired the creation of merchandise such as a full coloring book featuring the story of "Chicago Chance and Frank Robb", a Chance the Snapper bobblehead figurine, and two locally brewed beers, Revolution Brewing's Humboldt Gator and Urban Renewal Brewery's The Humble Gator.

As of July 2024, Chance the Snapper has been reported to be living a "glorious life" and is "the beefiest and bossiest" of the alligators at the St. Augustine Alligator Farm.
