= Crotalidae polyvalent immune Fab =

Antivenom drug

Clinical data
- Trade names: CroFab
- AHFS/Drugs.com: Micromedex Detailed Consumer Information

Identifiers
- CAS Number: 339086-32-7
- ChemSpider: none
- ChEMBL: ChEMBL1201592

Crotalidae polyvalent immune Fab (ovine), sold under the brandname CroFab, is a snake antivenin, indicated for North American crotalid (rattlesnake, copperhead and cottonmouth/water moccasin) snake envenomation.

CroFab is composed of several monovalent Fab (fragment antigen-binding) proteins derived from the blood of sheep immunized with one of four snake venoms: Crotalus atrox (western diamondback rattlesnake), Crotalus adamanteus (Eastern diamondback rattlesnake), Crotalus scutulatus (Mojave rattlesnake), or Agkistrodon piscivorus (cottonmouth or water moccasin). Each monospecific antivenin is purified from sheep serum, digested with the enzyme papain, and purified further, resulting in specific Fab fragments. The resulting four different Fab preparations are mixed to formulate the final product.

== Background ==
The production technology was invented by Drs. John Sullivan and Findlay Russell, developed clinically via multicenter clinical trials in the United States and commercialized by BTG Limited (formerly Protherics PLC). As reported in the Washington Post in July 2015, this was the only commercially available antivenin in the United States for the treatment of venomous snakebites until the release of a competing product, Anavip.

== Treatment ==
Crotalid snakebites can range from mild to life-threatening, depending on the size and type of snake, the amount of venom injected and the location of the bite. This in turn determines the number of vials of CroFab that are required by the patient. Untreated, the snake venom can cause severe pain and tissue damage that can result in the loss of a limb or even death. Prompt (within six hours of snake bite) treatment with CroFab is recommended.

== Adverse events ==
The most common adverse events reported in clinical studies were mild or moderate reactions involving the skin and appendages (primarily urticaria, rash, or pruritus), in 14 out of 42 patients. Three patients experienced a serious adverse event. Two patients had a severe allergic reaction (severe hives and a severe rash and pruritus) following treatment. One patient had a recurrent coagulopathy due to envenomation, which required re-hospitalisation and additional antivenin administration. In clinical trials, recurrent coagulopathy (the return of a coagulation abnormality after it has been successfully treated with antivenin), characterised by decreased fibrinogen, decreased platelets and elevated prothrombin time, occurred in approximately half of the patients studied. Recurrent coagulopathy may persist for one to two weeks or more. One patient discontinued CroFab therapy due to an allergic reaction. Patients with allergies to papain, chymopapain, other papaya extracts or the pineapple enzyme bromelain may also be at risk for an allergic reaction to CroFab.

== Cost ==
Leslie Boyer, director of the VIPER Institute and a member of the team that developed CroFab, collected data on the cost of production and marketing, and found that the largest true cost to payers in the United States was that of the legal, regulatory and hospital activities involved in selling the drug, nearly 75% of the total. Clinical trials contributed less than 10% of the cost, and 25% of that had been paid for by government grants. Other costs were the same as in Mexico.
