= Gomek =

Saltwater crocodile

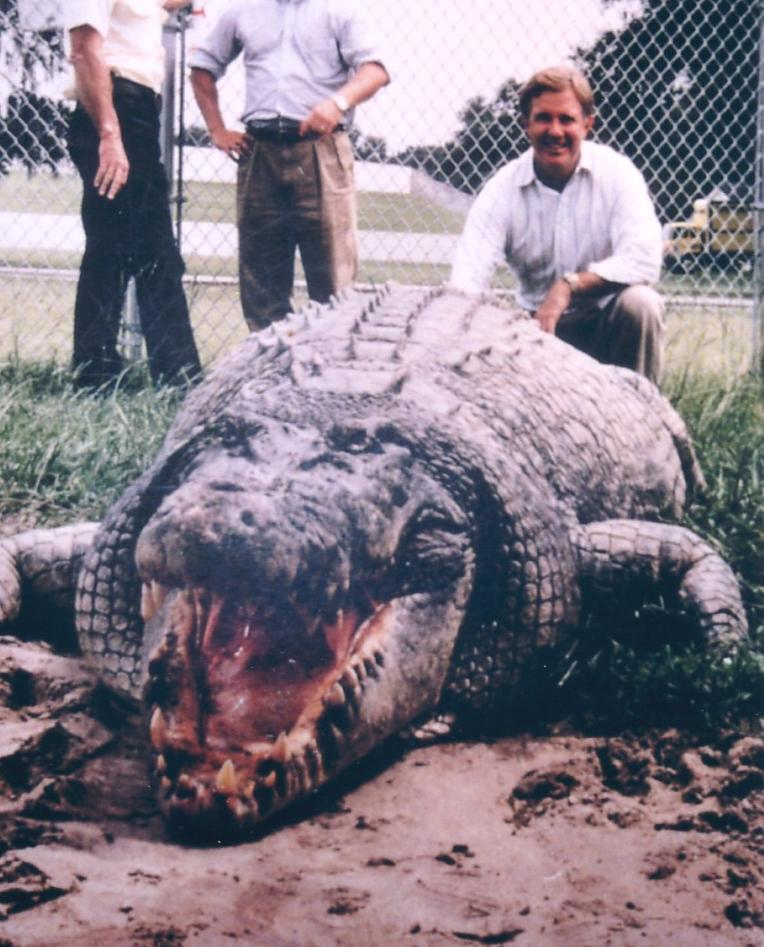
Gomek in 1989 (aged 62)

Gomek (1927 – March 6, 1997) was a large saltwater crocodile captured by George Craig in Papua New Guinea in 1968. He was purchased by Terri and Arthur Jones in 1985 and was kept in Ocala, Florida, for five years before being sold to the St. Augustine Alligator Farm Zoological Park in Florida. For 8 years he was known for his nutria-tossing abilities and his tolerance of people. Feeders of the beast were allowed to go into the enclosure and get as close as 1 metre from the large animal (a normally suicidal proximity) without any fear of attack. While feeders still used long tongs to feed Gomek, he was generally considered to be a "tame" beast and was a favorite of the St. Augustine Alligator Farm and people around the nation.

After many years, Gomek passed away from heart disease on March 6, 1997. By then, he was a very old crocodile, and one of the largest and tamest captive crocodiles in existence. At the time of his passing, he was 5.42 m (17 ft 9 in) long, and weighed 860 kilograms (1,896 lb) – as confirmed by St. Augustine Alligator Farm – and 70 years old. There is a tribute to Gomek near his former enclosure, displaying his stuffed remains. Gomek's old enclosure now houses his successors Maximo and his mate Sydney. Indigenous people of Southeast Asia have claimed to see up to 35-foot saltwater crocs, there are currently studies that are going on to look for these crocodiles but there has been no hard or supporting proof.
