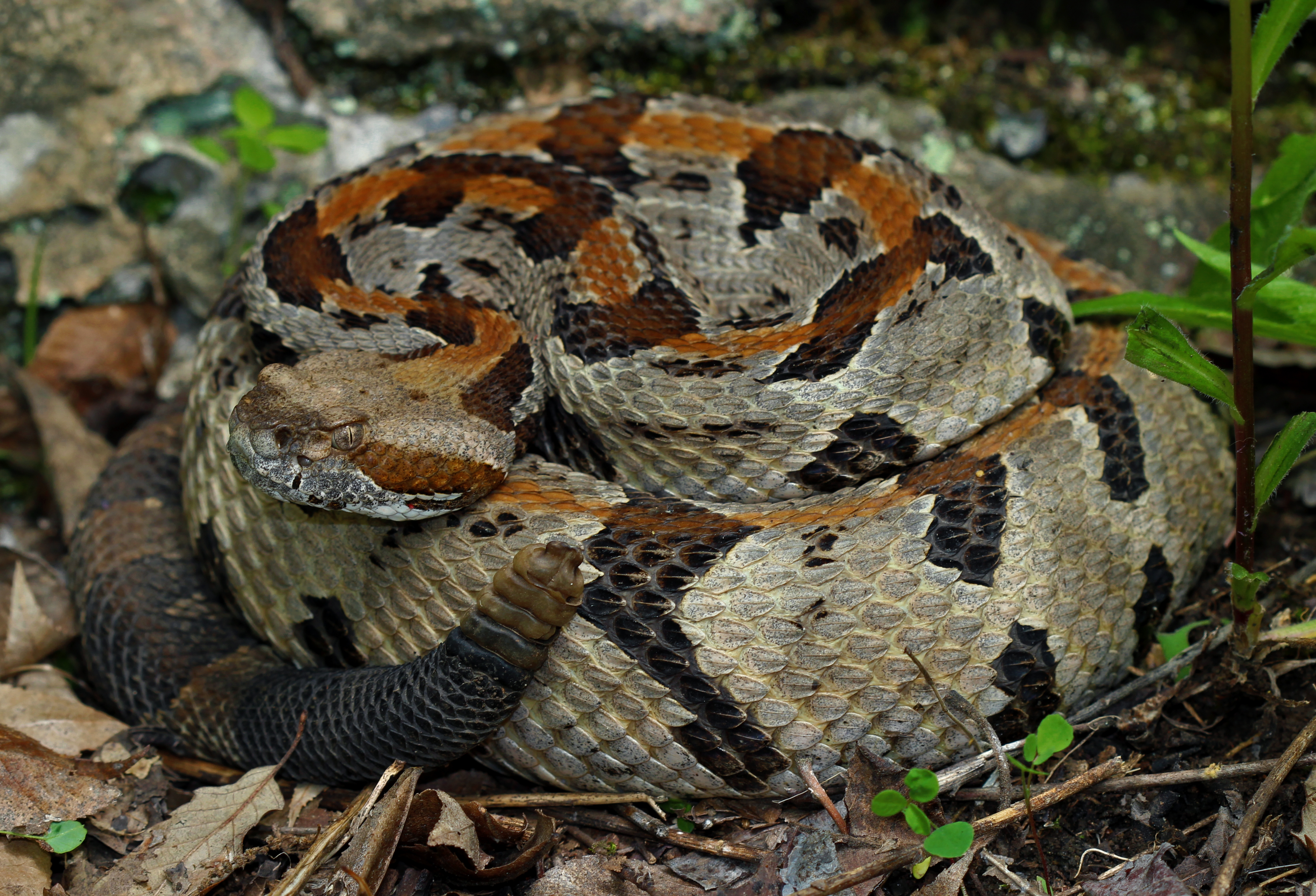

Conservation status
- Least Concern (IUCN 3.1)

- Apparently Secure (NatureServe)

Scientific classification
- Kingdom: Animalia
- Phylum: Chordata
- Class: Reptilia
- Order: Squamata
- Suborder: Serpentes
- Family: Viperidae
- Genus: Crotalus
- Species: C. horridus

Binomial name
- Crotalus horridus Linnaeus, 1758
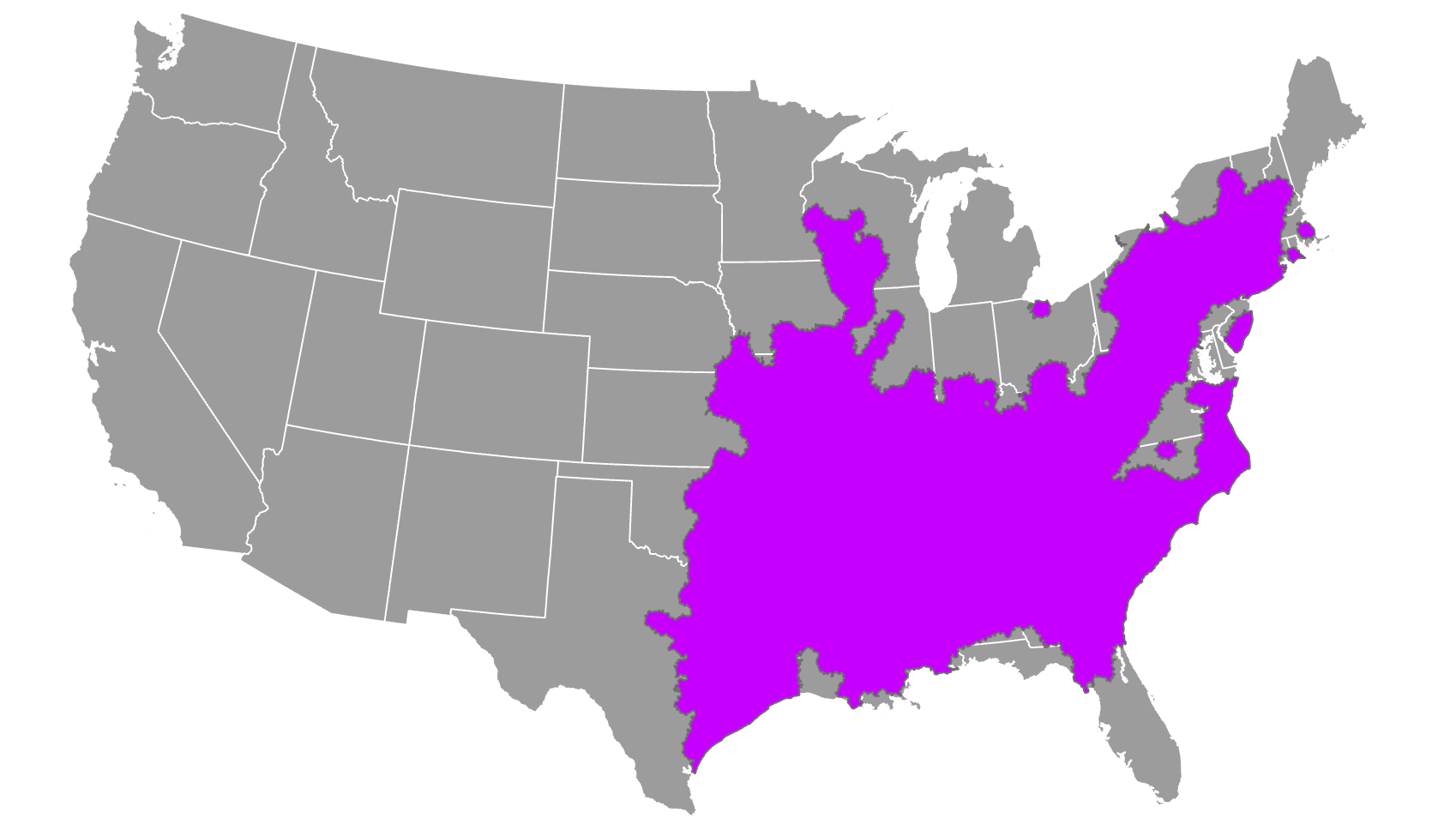
- Timber rattlesnake range

Synonyms
- List: Crotalus horridus Linnaeus, 1758; Crotalus boiquira Lacépède, 1789; Crotalus atricaudatus Latreille In Sonnini & Latreille, 1801; Crotalus zetazomae Brickell, 1805; Crotalinus cyanurus Rafinesque, 1818; Crotalus catesbaei Hemprich, 1820; Crotalurus cyanurus – Rafinesque, 1820; Caudisona horrida – Fleming, 1822; Crotalus horidus Gray, 1825 (ex errore); Crotalus durissus var. concolor Jan, 1859; Crotalus durissus var. melanurus Jan, 1859; Crotalus durissus var. mexicana Jan, 1863; Crotalus fasciatus Higgins, 1873; Crotalus horridus var. atricaudatus – Garman, 1884; Crotalus horridus – Boulenger, 1896; Crotalus durissus cincolor Notestein, 1905 (ex errore); Crotalus horridus horridus – Gloyd, 1935; Crotalus horridus atricaudatus – Gloyd, 1935; Crotalus horridus – Collins & Knight, 1980

= Timber rattlesnake =

Timber rattlesnake Temporal range: 10.3–0 Ma Miocene – Present

Species of reptile

The timber rattlesnake (Crotalus horridus), also known commonly as the banded rattlesnake, and the canebrake rattlesnake in the southern United States, is a species of pit viper in the family Viperidae. The species is native to the eastern United States. Like all other pit vipers, it is venomous, with a very toxic bite. Its venom is extremely potent, and both hemorrhagic and neurotoxic venom are present depending on population and location. C. horridus is the only rattlesnake species in most of the populous Northeastern United States and is one of the most northerly distributed venomous snakes in North America. There are no subspecies that are recognized as being valid.

== Taxonomy ==
The timber rattlesnake was one of the many reptile species originally described by Carl Linnaeus in the landmark 1758 10th edition of his Systema Naturae, and still bears its original name Crotalus horridus.

The subspecies C. h. atricaudatus (Latreille in Sonnini and Latreille, 1802), often referred to as the canebrake rattlesnake, is currently considered invalid. Previously, it was recognized by Gloyd (1936) and Klauber (1936). Based on an analysis of geographic variation, Pisani et al. (1972) concluded no subspecies should be recognized. This was rejected by Conant (1975), but followed by Collins and Knight (1980). Brown and Ernst (1986) found evidence for retaining the two subspecies, but stating them apart without having more information than usual is not possible, including adult size, color pattern, the number of dorsal scale rows, and the number of ventral scales. Dundee and Rossman (1989) recognized C. h. atricaudatus, but others take a more neutral point of view.

The timber rattlesnake is one of 36 species in the genus Crotalus. This genus can be distinguished from Sistrurus by the small scales atop the head, rather than nine large scales found on Sistrurus.

== Etymology ==
The name Crotalus is Latin for a rattle or, crŏtălisso to rattle or the sound of the castanet. Horridus is Latin, meaning horrid or dreadful, presumably in reference to its potentially lethal venom. Although southern populations are generally no longer recognized as a valid subspecies, the name canebrake rattlesnake (Crotalus horridus atricaudatus) is occasionally still used and commonly encountered in older literature. Atricaudatus is Latin meaning black-tailed (atri = black, and caudatus = tailed).

== Description ==
Adults usually grow to total length of 91–152 cm (36–60 in). In Pennsylvania, the smallest size females that could produce viable eggs was 72.2 cm (28.4 in). Most adult timber rattlesnakes found measure less than 115 cm (45 in) in total length and weigh between 500 and 1,500 g (1.1 and 3.3 lb), often being towards the lower end of that range. The maximum reported total length is 189.2 cm (74.5 in) (Klauber, 1956). Holt (1924) mentions a large specimen caught in Montgomery County, Alabama, which had a total length of 159 cm (62.5 in) and weighed 2.5 kg (5.5 lb). Large specimens can reportedly weigh as much as 4.5 kg (9.9 lb).

The dorsal scales are keeled and arranged in 21–26 scale rows at midbody (usually 25 rows in the southern part of its geographic range, and 23 rows in the northern part). The ventral scales number 158–177 in males and 163–183 in females. Males have 20–30 subcaudal scales, while females have 15–26. The rostral scale is normally a little taller than it is wide. In the internasal-prefrontal area there are 4–22 scales that include 2 large, triangular internasal scales that border the rostral, followed by two large, quadrangular prefrontal scales (anterior canthals) that may contact each other along the midline, or may be separated by many small scales. Between the supraocular and internasal scales, only a single canthal scale is present. Five to seven intersupraocular scales are seen. The number of prefoveal scales varies between two and eight. Usually, the first supralabial scale is in broad contact with the prenasal scale, although slightly to moderately separated along its posteroventral margin by the most anterior prefoveals.

Dorsally, they have a pattern of dark brown or black crossbands on a yellowish-brown or grayish background. The crossbands have irregular zig-zag edges, and may be V- or M-shaped. Often a rust-colored vertebral stripe is present. Ventrally, they are yellowish, uniform, or marked with black. Melanism is common, and some individuals are very dark, almost solid black. The tails of C. horridus are black and can be described as 'velvety.'

Four color variations of timber rattlesnakes (Crotalus horridus) from one Missouri county

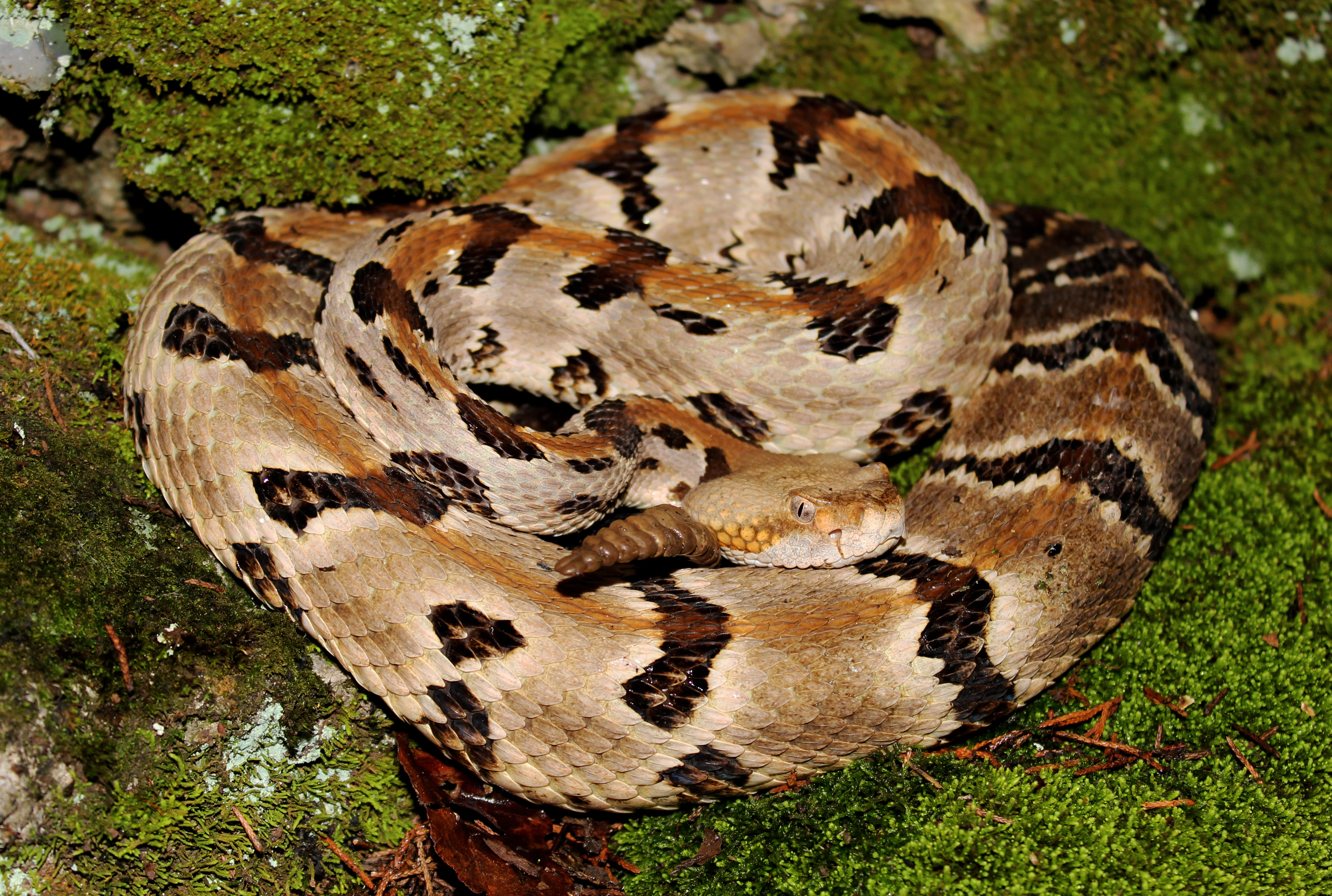
Timber rattlesnakes, in situ

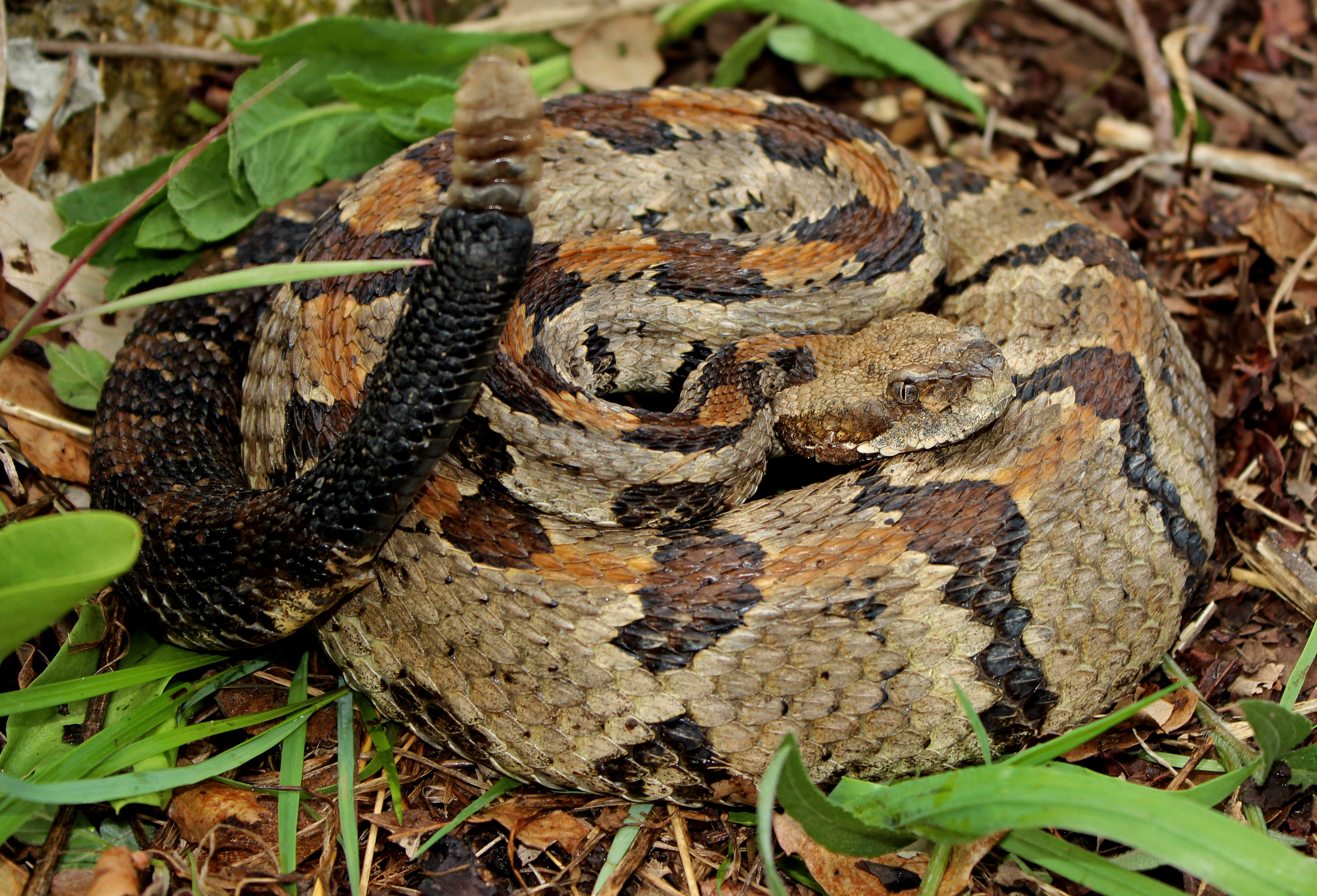
Timber rattlesnakes, in situ

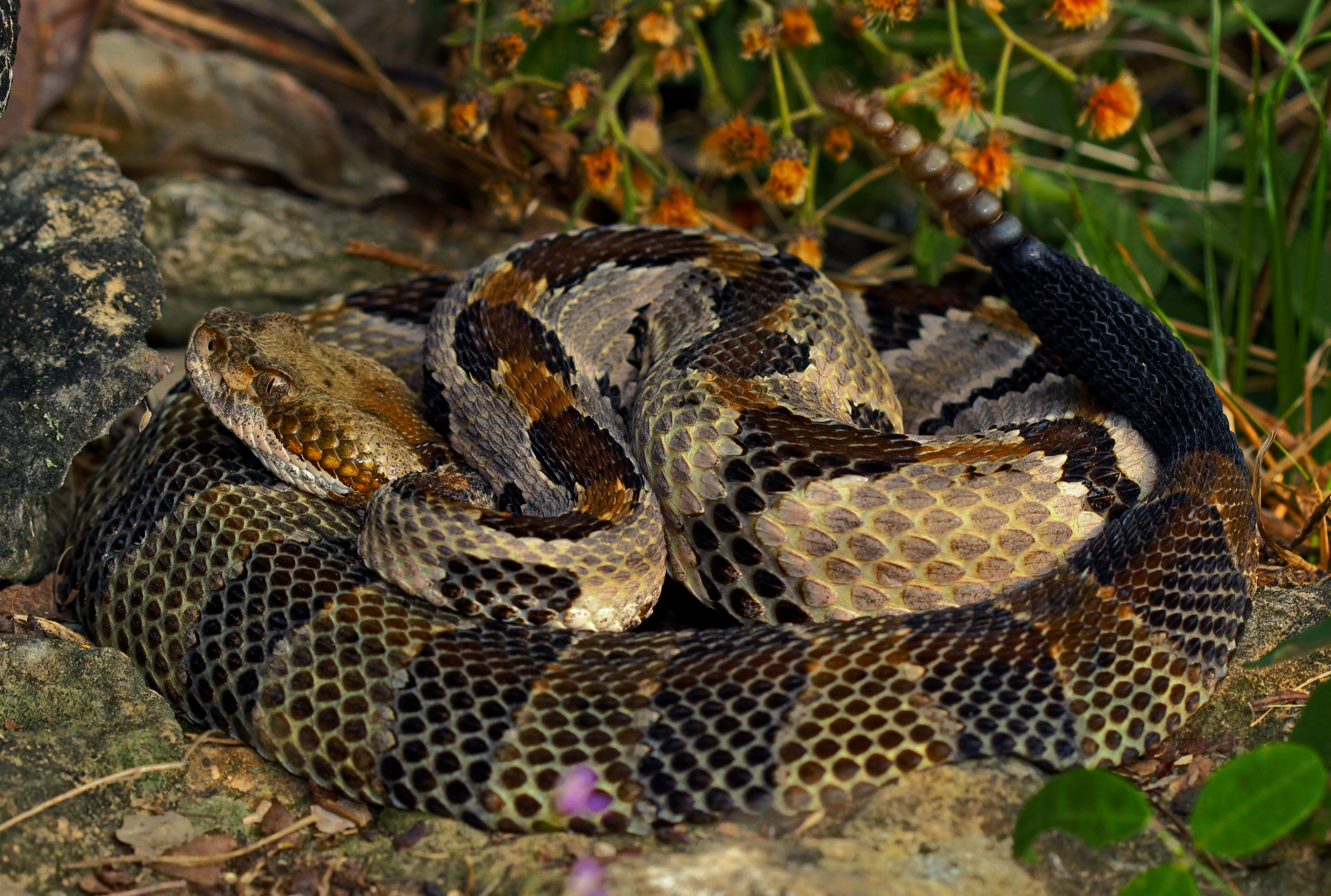
Timber rattlesnakes, in situ

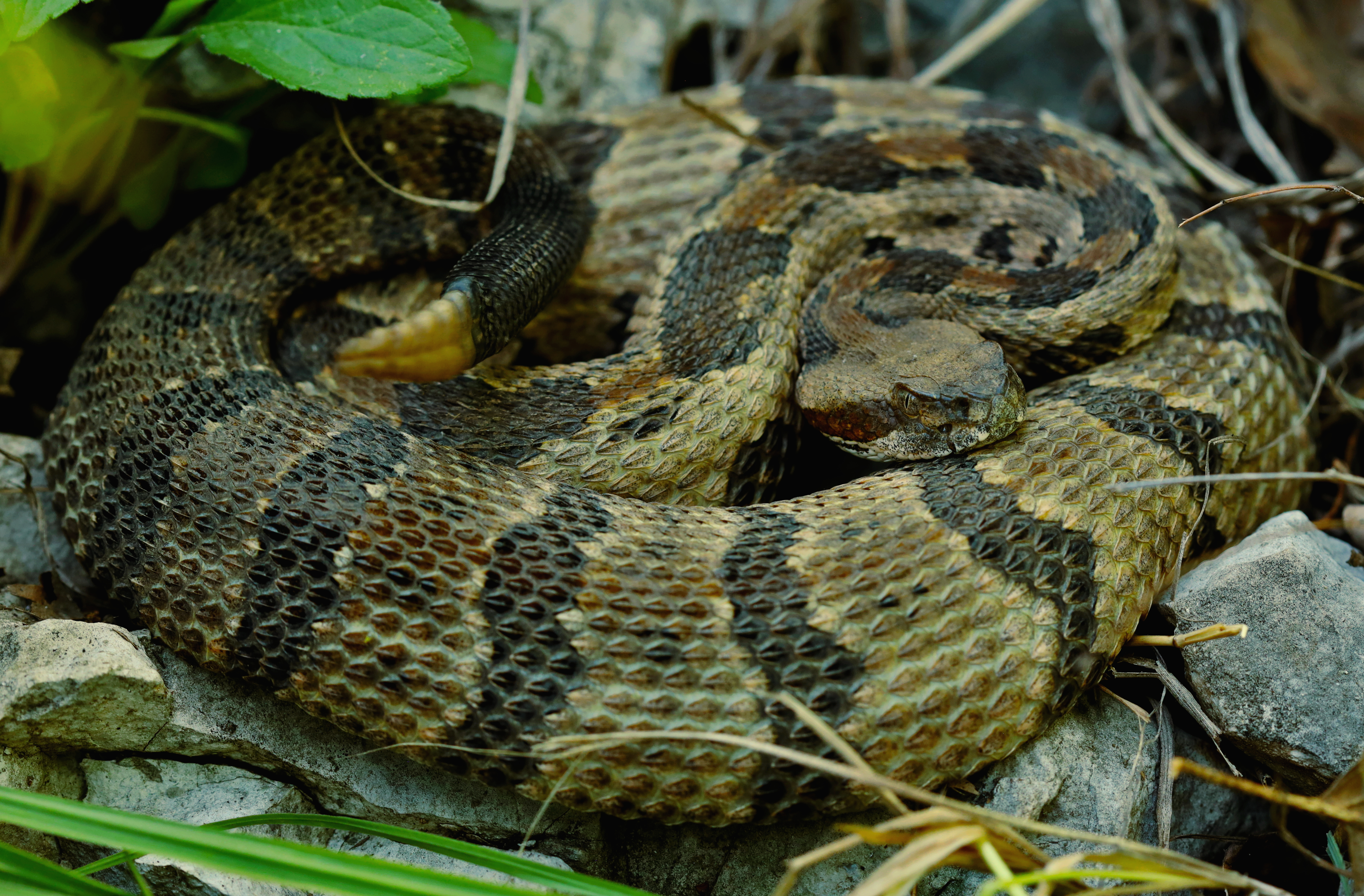
Timber rattlesnakes, in situ

== Distribution and habitat ==
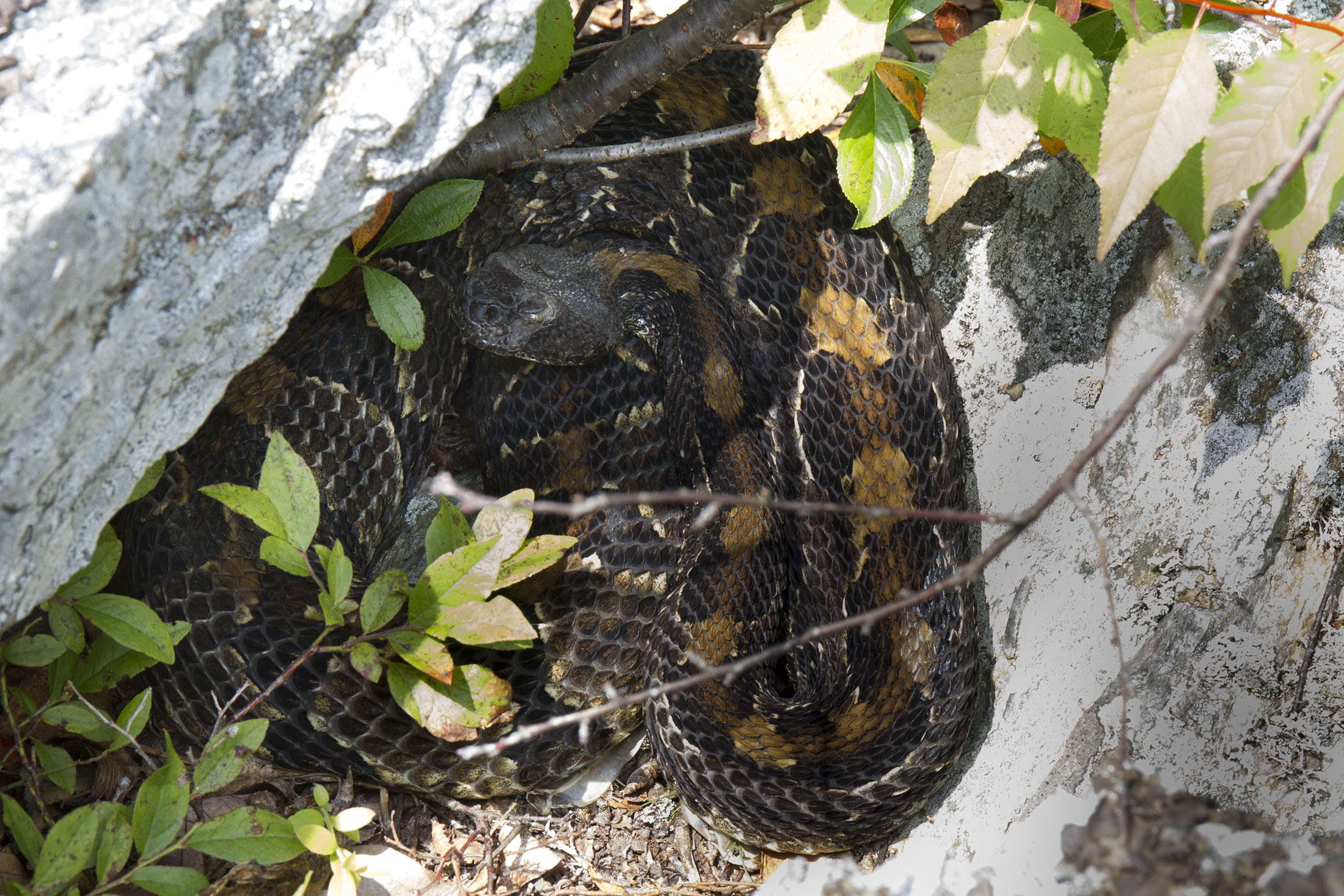
Populations from cooler regions like northern latitudes or high elevations, are often darker like this one from Connecticut.

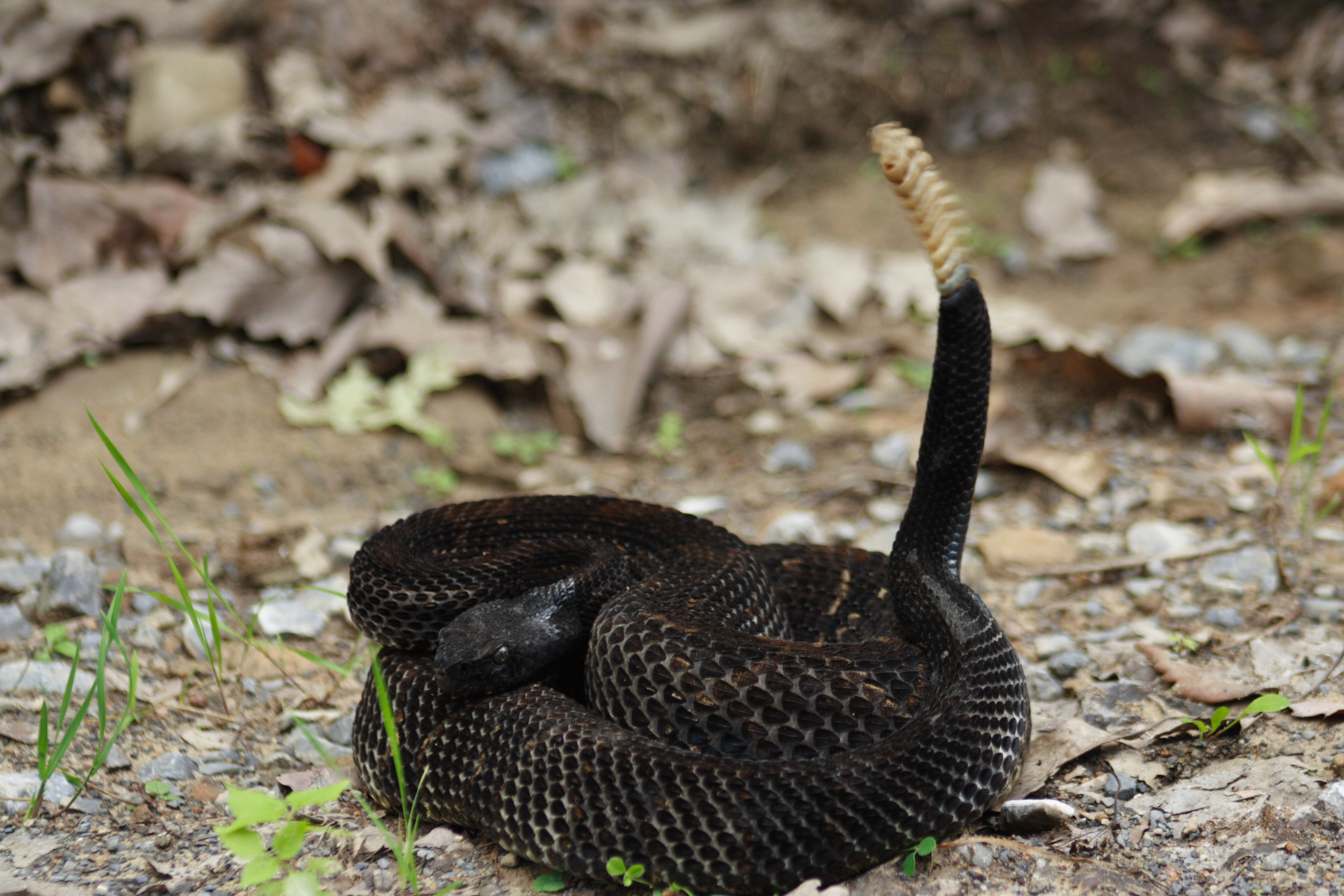
A melanistic individual from Pennsylvania

Timber rattlesnakes are present in the eastern United States from southern Minnesota and southern New Hampshire, south to East Texas and North Florida. One hundred and fifteen rattlesnakes have been marked within Brown County State Park in Indiana, one of the few places where they can be found in the state.

Its historic range includes southern Ontario and southern Quebec in Canada, but in May 2001, the Canadian Species at Risk Act listed it as extirpated in Canada. A Canadian government sponsored recovery strategy is under study to support the reintroducing of this predator of many pests to its former Canadian habitat.

Many were present in some of the thick forest areas of central and southeastern Iowa, mostly within the Mississippi, Skunk, Iowa, and Des Moines River valleys, in several places in these areas; bites from timber rattlesnakes have been widespread, especially in a localized area of Geode State Park, in southeastern Henry County, along Credit Island Park, in southern Scott County, and in the forested areas of southern Clinton County. The museum at Amana Colony, Iowa, asserts that one founding family lost their firstborn, a daughter, at the age of three, due to a rattlesnake bite she received while playing on a woodpile in the 19th century.

In Pennsylvania, it is not present west of Chestnut Ridge, which is in the Laurel Highlands, nor is it present in the urban areas of the southeastern corner of the state. Thus, its range does not include Philadelphia and Pittsburgh, the two largest cities in Pennsylvania.

C. horridus is extirpated from Michigan, Delaware, Maine and Rhode Island, and is considered close to extirpation in New Hampshire.

Generally, this species is found in deciduous forests in rugged terrain. C. horridus can be found in a variety of terrestrial habitats including lowland cane thickets (thus the common name canebrake rattlesnake), high areas around swamps and river floodplains, hardwood and pine forests, mountainous areas, and rural habitats in farming areas. During the summer, gravid females seem to prefer open, rocky ledges where the temperatures are higher, while males and nongravid females tend to spend more time in cooler, denser woodland with more closed forest canopy.

== Behavior ==
Female timber rattlers often bask in the sun before giving birth, in open rocky areas known as "basking knolls".

During the winter, timber rattlesnakes brumate in dens and limestone crevices, often together with copperheads (Agkistrodon contortrix) and rat snakes (Pantherophis alleghaniensis, P. obsoletus, and P. spiloides). Timber rattlesnakes exhibit high levels of philopatry to their natural hibernaculum, which means that they are likely to return to the same hibernaculum, or communal wintering den, each year. Timber rattlesnakes occupying the same hibernaculum (especially juveniles and pregnant females) have been reported to be more closely related to each other than to the rattlesnakes in neighboring dens; studies have suggested this behavior may be related to juveniles' ability to track chemical cues from relatives. Timber rattlesnakes have also been found to leave dens multiple times in midwinter to briefly bask.

Males often mate farther away from winter hibernacula than females.

=== Reproduction ===
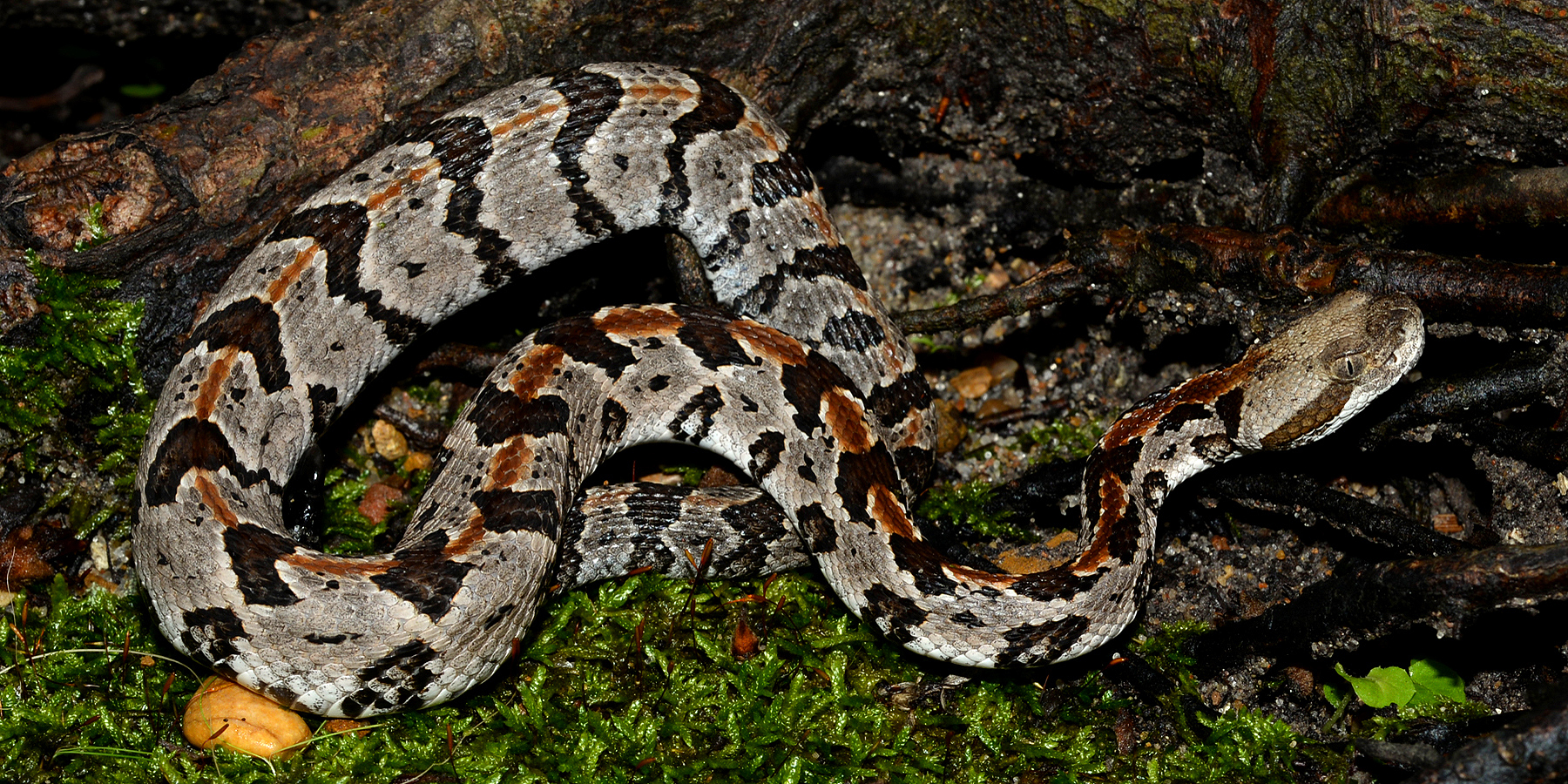
A juvenile from east Texas

A lifetime reproduction study of a population in the Adirondack Mountains of New York found that the first reproduction occurs at a mean age of 9.6 years. The mean length of reproductive cycles is 4.2 years, the mean reproductive life span is 9.6 years, and the average fecundity is 7.7 offspring per litter. Nonviable offspring were found in 20% of the field litters. Most females only reproduced once in a lifetime. Macrogeographic differences were observed within the population and may have correlated resource levels influencing growth rates and additionally human encounters could influence survival.

=== Diet ===
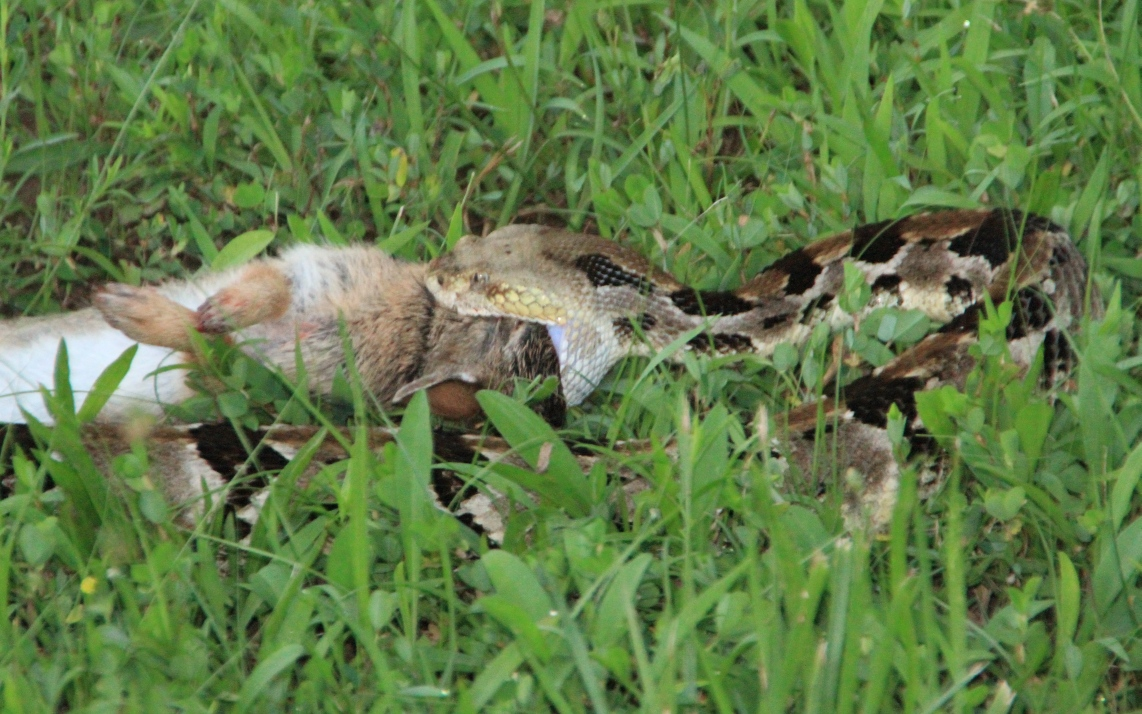
A timber rattlesnake eating a rabbit (Sylvilagus)

The prey of the timber rattlesnake are mainly small mammals, in particular mice, rats, squirrels, and rabbits, but may include small birds, frogs, and other small animals. Like most rattlesnakes, timber rattlesnakes are known to use chemical cues to find sites to ambush their prey and often strike their prey and track them until they can be consumed. Timber rattlesnakes are known to use fallen logs as a waiting site for prey to pass by, giving them an elevated perch from which to effectively strike their prey, which is almost entirely terrestrial rather than arboreal (even arboreal prey such as squirrels tend to be caught when they come to the ground). If the arboreal prey (squirrels) are in the trees, it was found that the snake might indicate vertical tree posture, meaning it leans up against a tree looking at the squirrel and waiting for it to come down. The primary foods by genera of timber rattlesnakes were as follows: Peromyscus (33.3%), Microtus (10.9%), Tamias (qv) (10.6%), Sylvilagus (10.4%), Sigmodon (5.3%) and Sciurus (4.2%). Based on examination of the snout-to-vent length, juvenile timber rattlesnakes were found to differ slightly in dietary preferences from adult rattlesnakes, being more likely to consume smaller prey such as shrews (averaging 8 g (0.28 oz) and unable to attack subadult eastern cottontail rabbits (averaging 500–1,000 g (1.1–2.2 lb) but Peromyscus was the number one prey item for both young and adult rattlesnakes. Several birds, although always secondary to mammals, are also known to be hunted, mainly ground-dwelling species such as bobwhites, but also a surprising number of passerines.

Prey sometimes exhibit anti-snake displays like tail-flagging, but timber rattlesnakes show no immediate or overt response to these displays. There is no rattling, striking, or other defensive behavior in response to prey anti-snake displays.

=== Venom ===
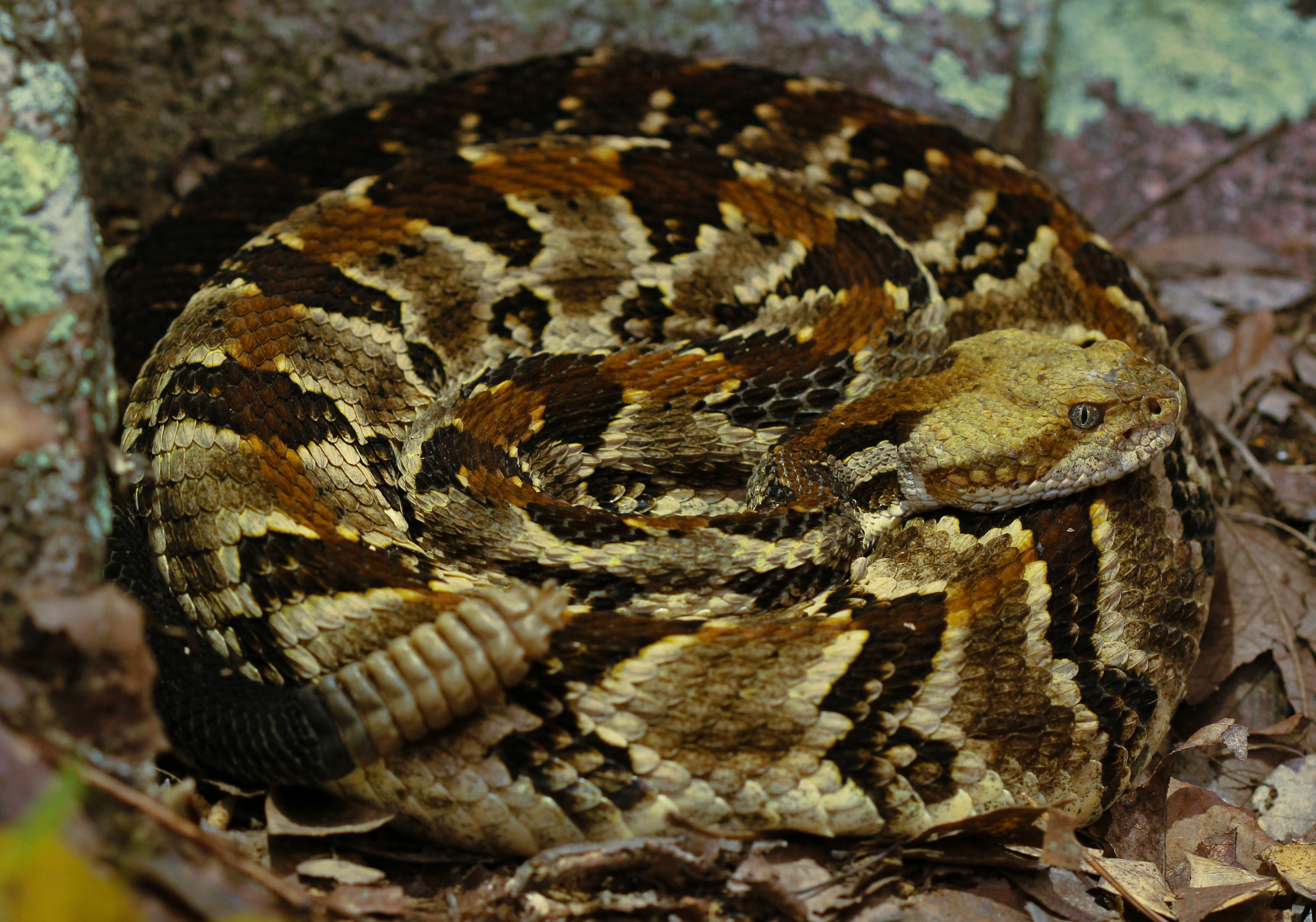
Timber rattlesnake (Crotalus horridus) from Missouri

Potentially, this is one of North America's most dangerous snakes, due to its long fangs, impressive size, and high venom yield. This is to some degree offset by its relatively mild disposition and long brumation period. Before striking, they often perform a good deal of preliminary rattling and feinting. Cist (1845) described how he lived in western Pennsylvania for many years, and the species was quite common there, but in all that time, he heard of only a single death resulting from its bite.

A timber rattlesnake will always make the effort to retreat from perceived danger before deciding to attack, and if left undisturbed poses nearly no threat to the humans who encounter them. Educating people about the shy and skittish behavior of timber rattlesnakes is an easy way to save lives, as they will only attack if they are cornered. The easiest way to keep oneself safe in areas with known and suspected dens of rattlesnakes is simply to avoid rockshelters they prefer to den in, and especially to not attempt to enter the den, as this is a perfect opportunity for the rattlesnake to act defensively. The remote and wooded habitat of these snakes makes emergency medical care difficult or even impossible with the rapid progression of venom-induced incapacitation, and thus it is critical knowledge for human safety to not disturb the denning rattlesnakes in the rare chance of encountering one unexpectedly.

Considerable geographic and ontogenetic variation occurs regarding the toxicity of the venom, which can be said for many rattlesnake species. Four venom patterns have been described for this species: Type A is largely neurotoxic, and is found in various parts of the southern range. One effect of the toxin can be generalized myokymia. Type B is hemorrhagic and proteolytic, and is found consistently in the north and in parts of the southeast. Type A + B is found in areas where the aforementioned types apparently intergrade in southwestern Arkansas and northern Louisiana. Type C venom has none of the above components and is relatively weak.

The neurotoxic component of the type A venom is referred to as canebrake toxin, and is a phospholipase A_{2}. It is analogous to the neurotoxins found in the venoms of several other rattlesnake species, and when present, contributes significantly to the overall toxicity. Other components found in the venom include a small basic peptide that works as a myotoxin, a fibrinogen-clotting enzyme that can produce defibrination syndrome, and a bradykinin-releasing enzyme.

CroFab antivenom, while not specific for C. horridus, is used to treat envenomations from this species.

== Symbol ==
The Gadsden flag depicting a timber rattlesnake

The timber rattlesnake was designated the state reptile of West Virginia in 2008. That state's legislature praised "...a proud contribution by the eighth grade class at Romney Middle School, from West Virginia's oldest county, in West Virginia's oldest town, to have been instrumental in making the timber rattlesnake the state reptile..."

This snake became a prominent symbol of American anger and resolve during the American Revolution due to its fearsome reputation. In the 18th century, European-trained doctors and scientists had little firsthand experience with or information on timber rattlesnakes, and treatment of their bites was poorly effective. The motto Nemo me impune lacesset (with the verb in the future tense) appears above a Crotalus horridus on a 1778 $20 bill from Georgia as an early example of the colonial use of the coiled rattlesnake symbol, which later became famous on the Gadsden flag, a flag that has been used by advocates of libertarianism, individualism, and small government.

== Conservation status ==
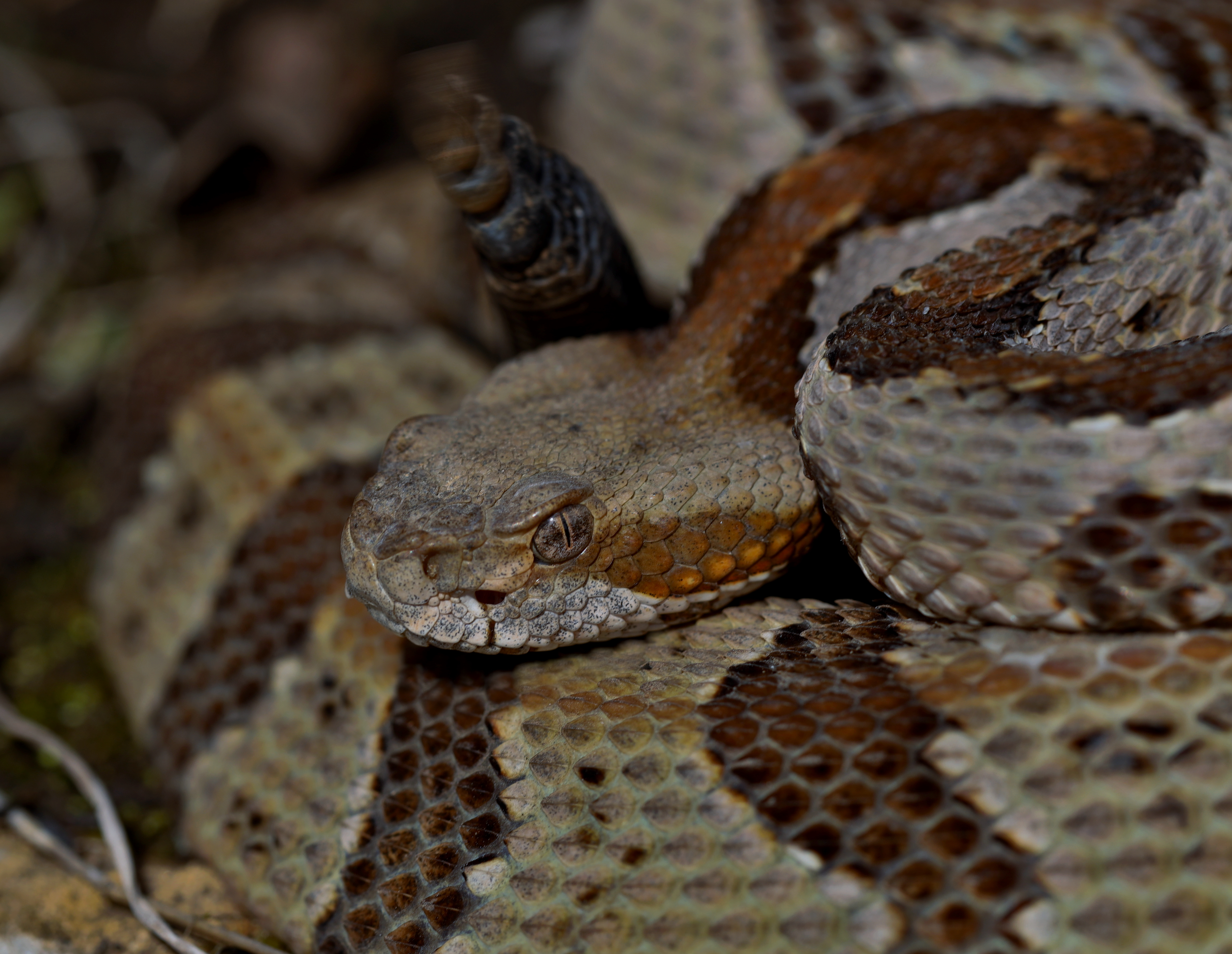
Timber Rattlesnake (Crotalus horridus)

This species is classified as least concern on the IUCN Red List (assessed in 2007). Species are listed as such due to their wide distribution, presumed large population, or because they are unlikely to be declining fast enough to qualify for listing in a more threatened category.

Crotalus horridus has been extirpated from many areas, particularly in the northern part of its range, and is classified as endangered in six states and threatened in five others. The timber rattlesnake is listed as endangered in New Jersey, Ohio, Vermont, Connecticut, Massachusetts, Virginia, Indiana, and New Hampshire. The species is listed as threatened in Illinois and New York

In New York, timber rattlesnakes are "extirpated at 26% of historically known dens, and nearly extirpated at another 5%". Brown (1984, 1988) suggested denning populations in New York have been reduced by 50–75% of their historical numbers.

In Massachusetts, the snakes are active from mid-May to mid-October. Early settlers were afraid of the snake, as its population was widespread throughout the state. The town of Westborough paid 13 men two shillings per day to rid a local hill of snakes in 1680. The hill had so many rattlesnakes, it was named "Boston Hill" because the number of snakes killed rivaled the population of the young city of Boston. In Milford, men would hunt the rattlesnakes between May and early June. According to Adin Ballou, when he arrived in town in 1824, snakes were still abundant, and by 1881 they were still reported in some areas of town. Since that time their habitat has been reduced to the Blue Hills south of Boston, the Berkshires in Western Massachusetts, and parts of the Connecticut River Valley, notably in the area of the Holyoke Range. The snake is so rare in the state that it is rarely encountered by people and is considered endangered, making it illegal to harass, kill, collect, or possess. In September 2021, a five-foot-long timber rattlesnake was recorded on video on a trail in the Blue Hills Reservation.

Timber rattlesnakes have already been extirpated in Maine and Rhode Island and only one population remains in New Hampshire. They are protected in many of the Appalachian states, but their populations continue to decline. While C. horridus was historically abundant throughout New England, there has been a recent decline in the last known population in New Hampshire that is heading toward extinction because of genetic isolation, inbreeding, and stochastic weather events that render the population susceptible to opportunistic pathogens.

Closeup of the heads of four Crotalus horridus

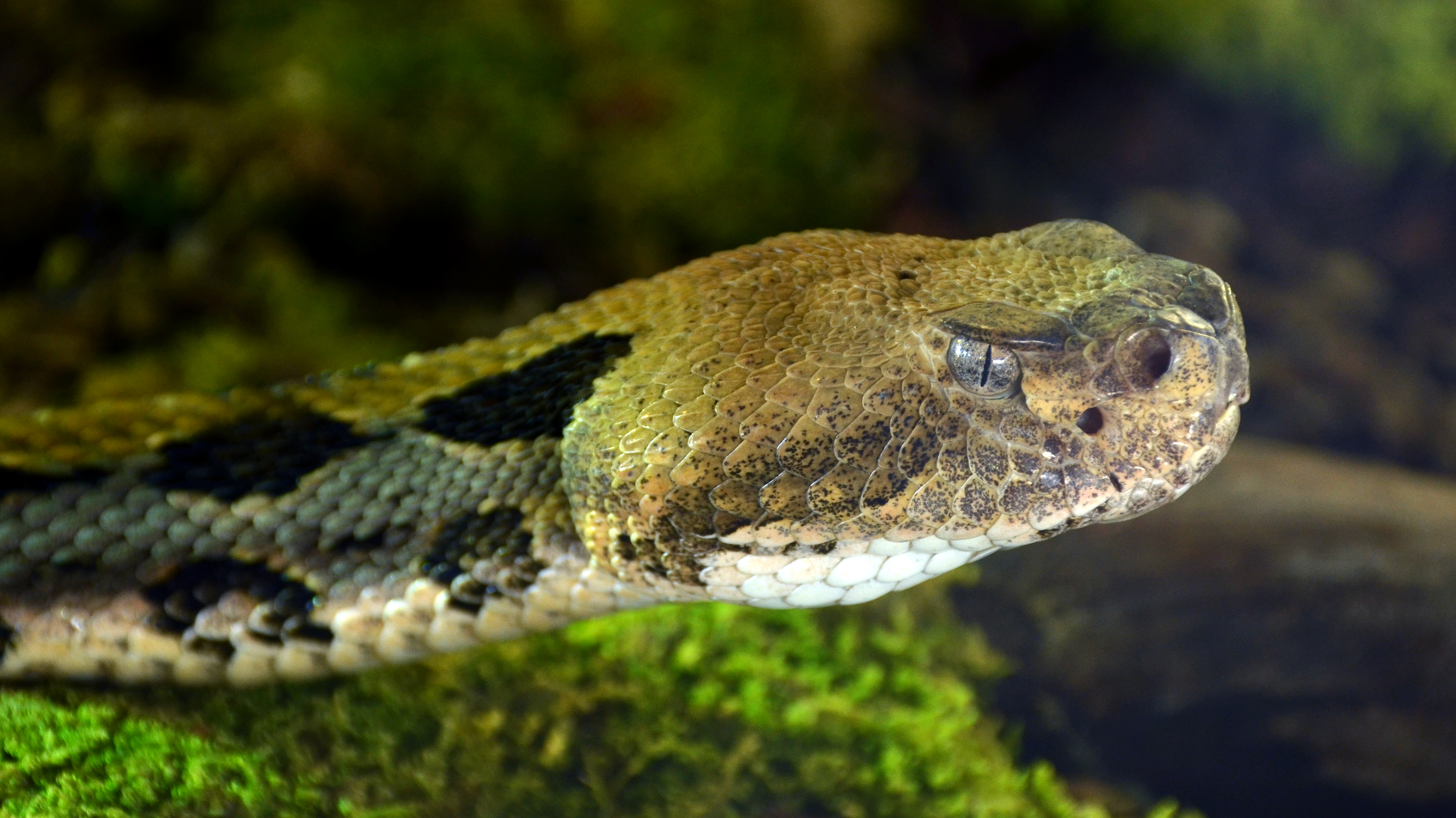
The pit between the eye and nostril is sensitive to infrared radiation for locating prey.

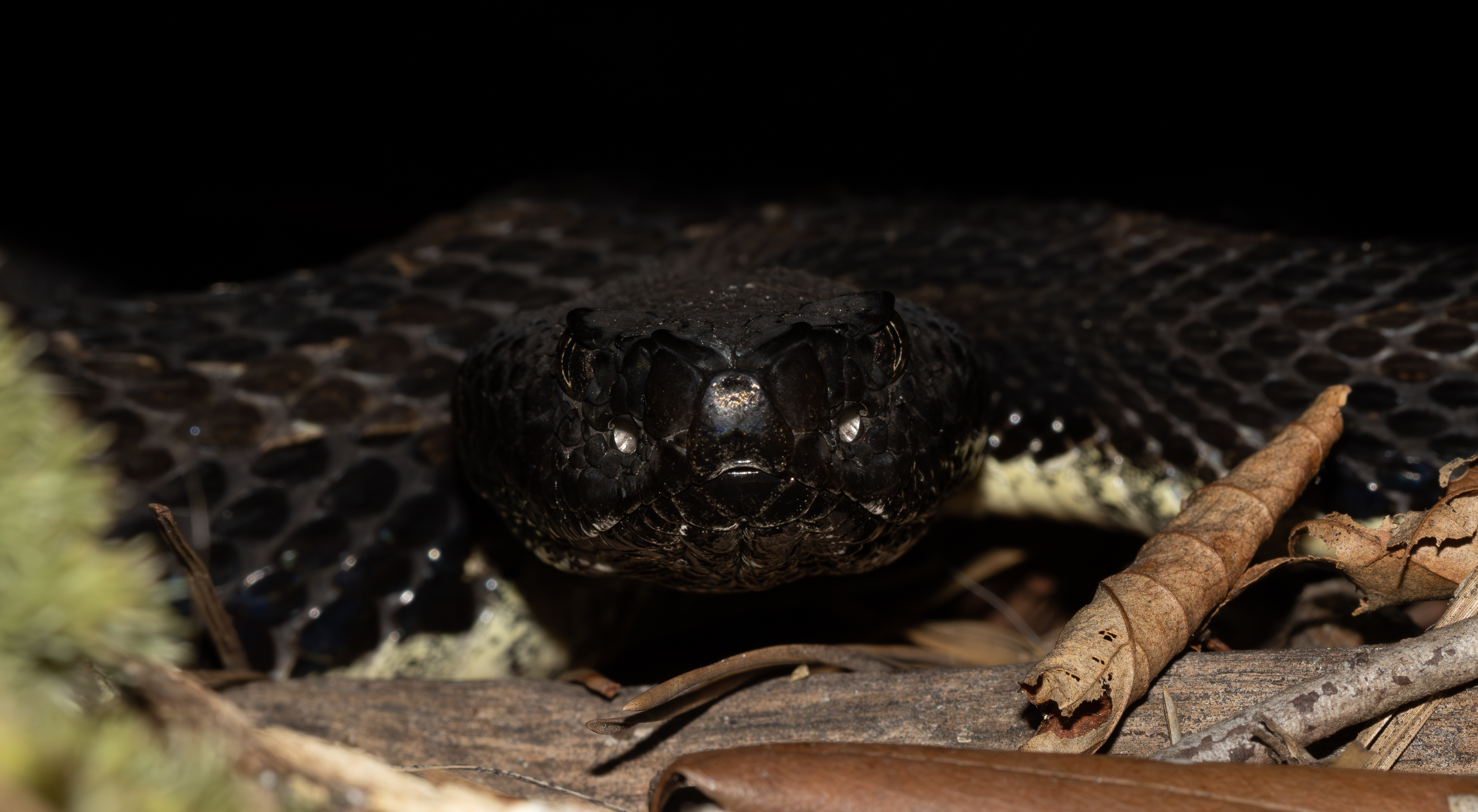
Frontal view of the head of a melanistic timber rattlesnake from Pennsylvania

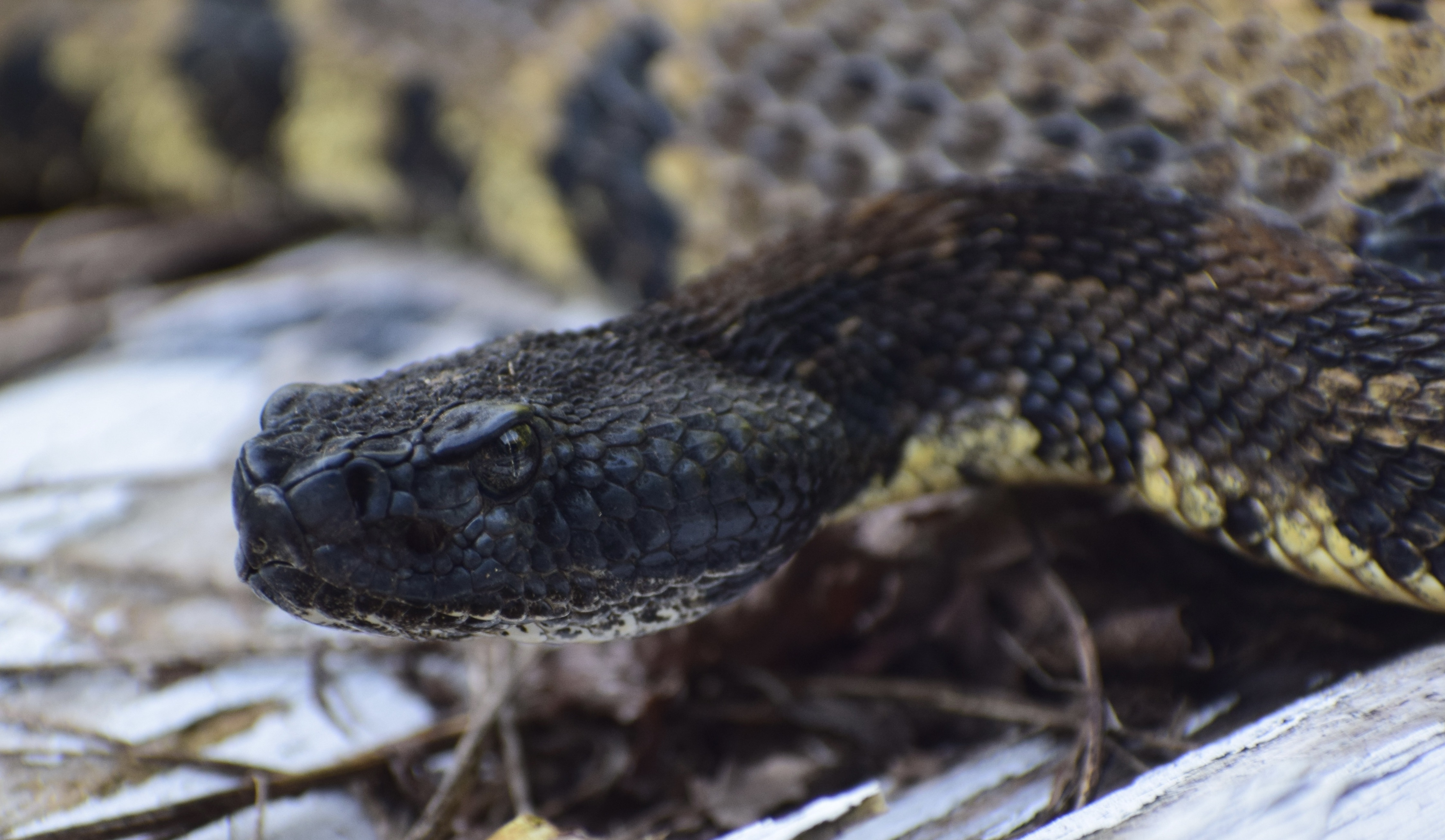
A black headed timber rattlesnake from West Virginia

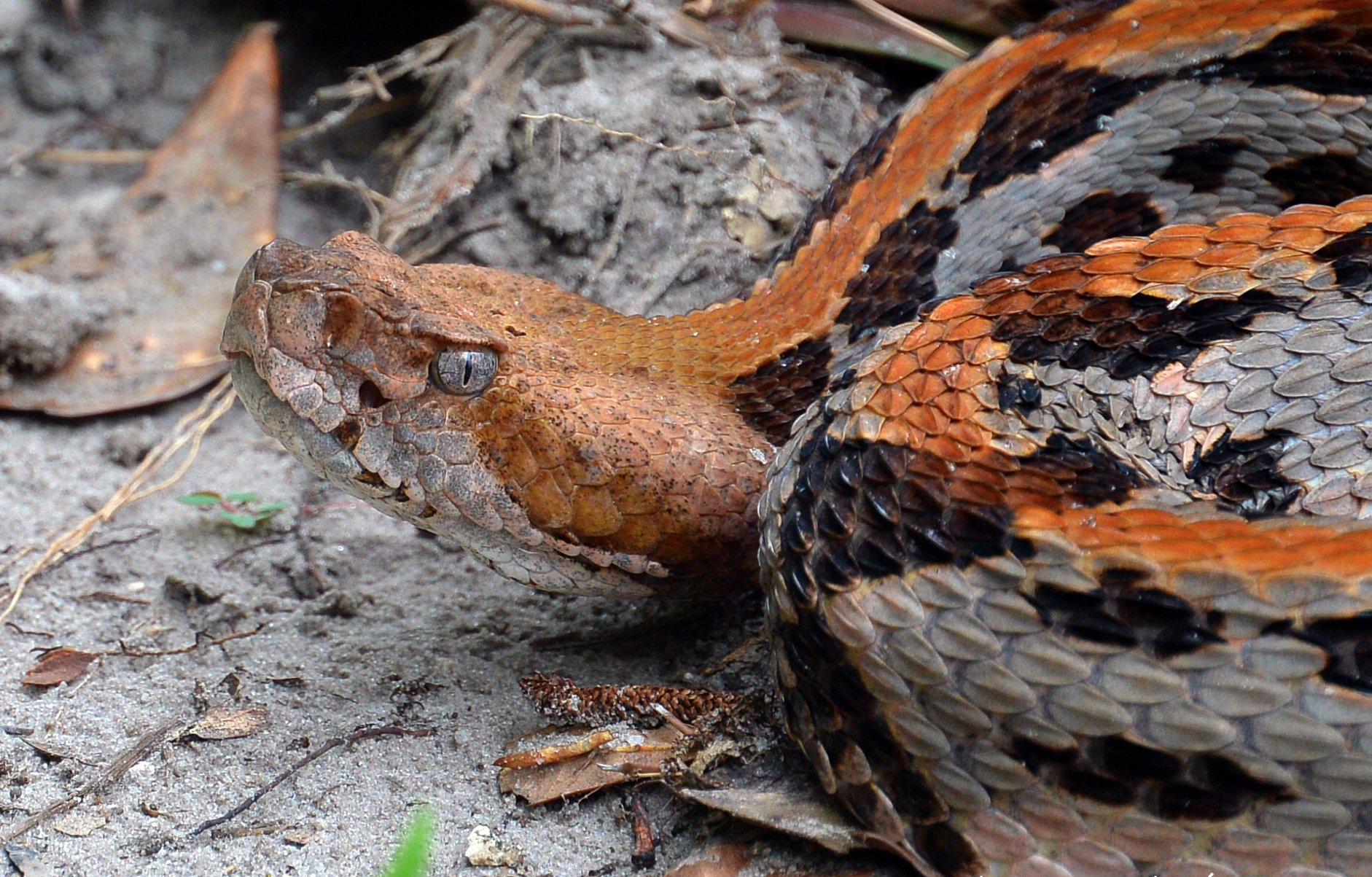
An unusual redheaded canebrake rattlesnake from north Florida

== See also ==
- Snakebite
