= Anavip =

North American rattlesnake antivenin

Clinical data
- Trade names: Anavip
- Other names: Crotalidae immune F(ab')2 (equine); Viper antivenom
- AHFS/Drugs.com: Monograph

Legal status
- Legal status: US: ℞-only

Identifiers
- PubChem SID: 482023934
- DrugBank: DB14114
- UNII: 92VV7G83ED

Anavip is the brand name of a snake antivenin indicated for the management of people with North American rattlesnake envenomation. As defined by the US Food and Drug Administration (FDA), the proper name is crotalidae immune F(ab')2 (equine). It is manufactured by Rare Disease Therapeutics.

Anavip is a divalent fragment antigen-binding protein, F(ab')_{2}, derived from the blood of horses immunized with the venom of the snakes Bothrops asper and Crotalus durissus. The product is produced by pepsin digestion of horse blood plasma then purified resulting in a preparation containing >85% F(ab')_{2}.
