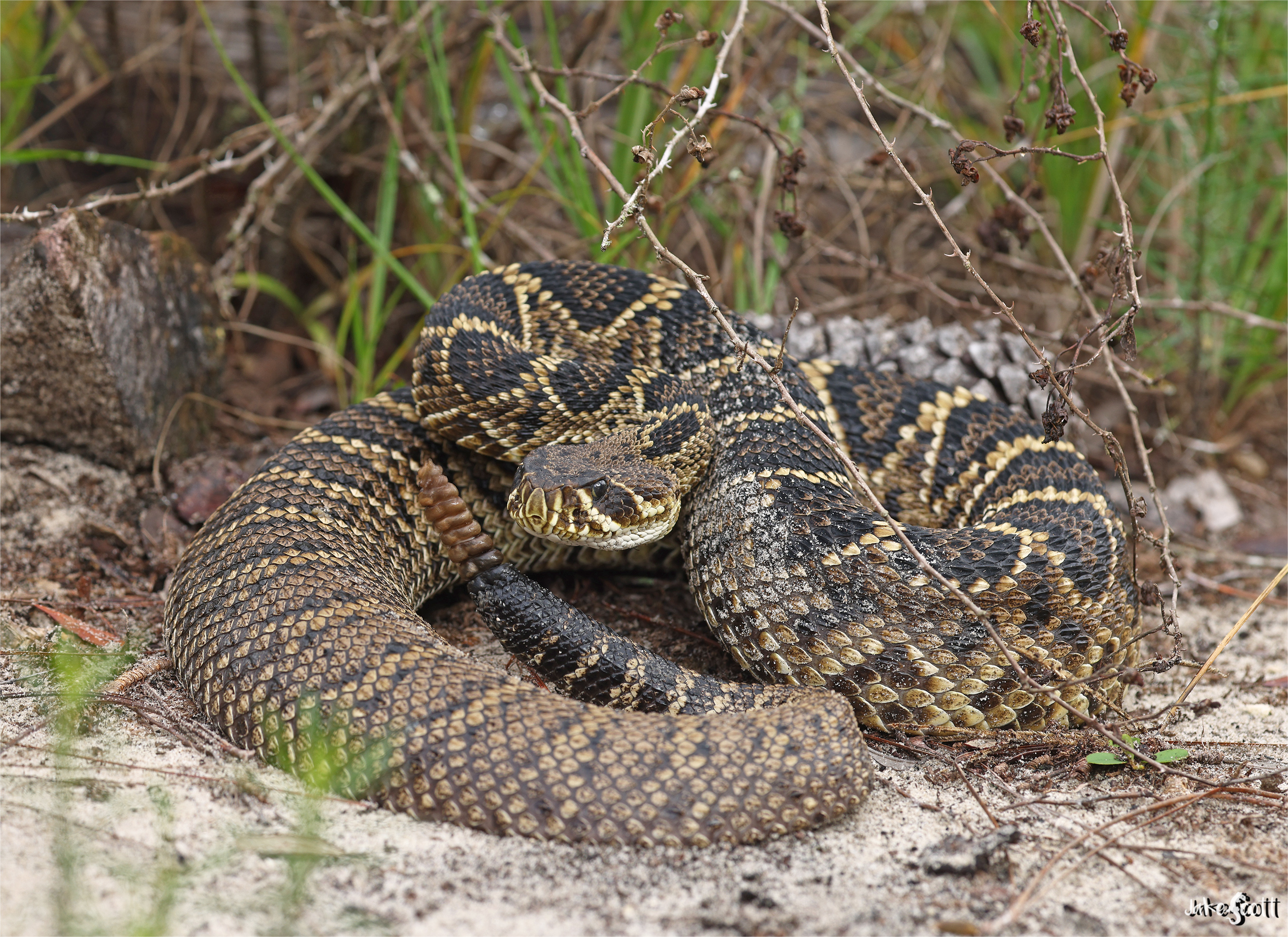

Conservation status
- Least Concern (IUCN 3.1)

- Vulnerable (NatureServe)

Scientific classification
- Kingdom: Animalia
- Phylum: Chordata
- Class: Reptilia
- Order: Squamata
- Suborder: Serpentes
- Family: Viperidae
- Genus: Crotalus
- Species: C. adamanteus

Binomial name
- Crotalus adamanteus Palisot de Beauvois, 1799
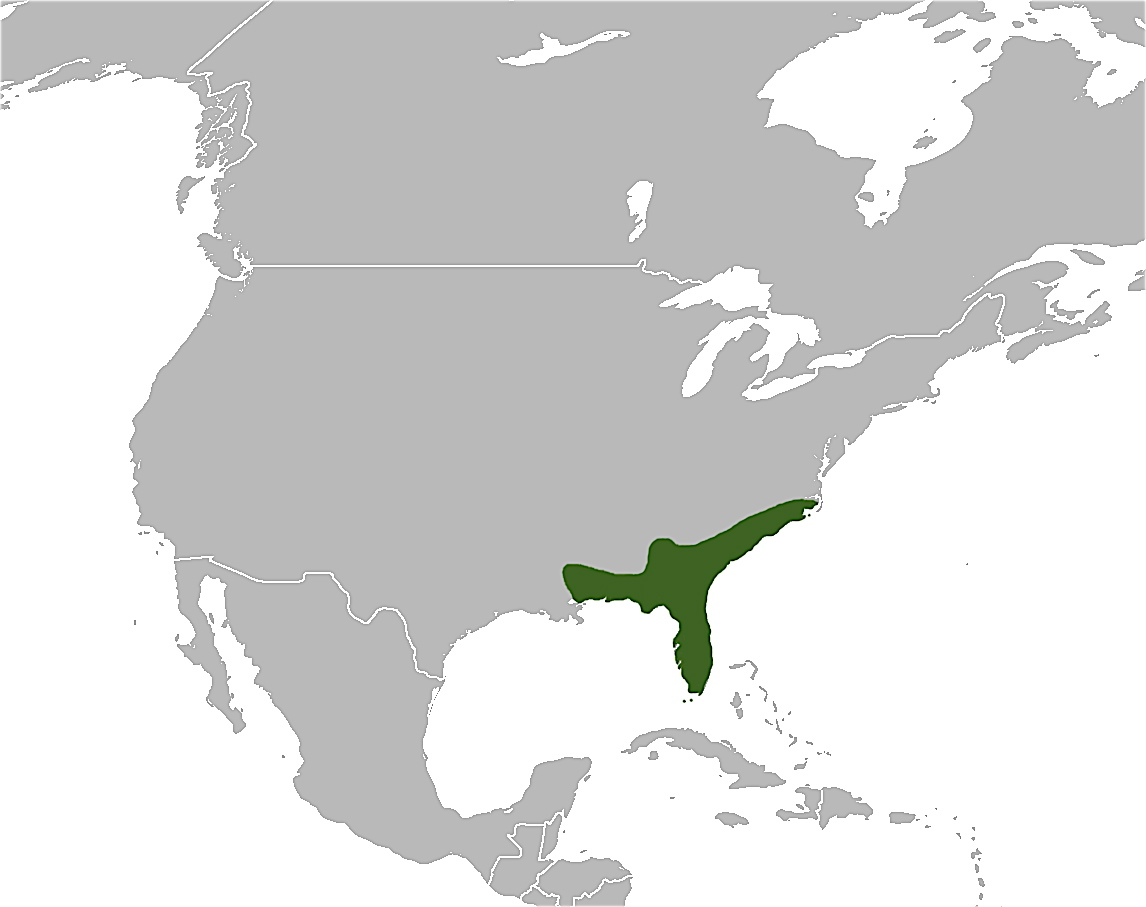

Synonyms
- Crotalus adamanteus Palisot de Beauvois, 1799; Crotalus rhombifer Latreille in Sonnini & Latreille, 1801; Crotalus rhombiferus — Brickell, 1805; Crotalus adamanteus var. adamanteus — Jan, 1858; C[audisona]. adamantea — Cope, 1867; Crotalus adamanteus adamanteus — Cope, 1875; Crotalus adamanteus pleistofloridensis Brattstrom, 1954; Crotalus giganteus Brattstrom, 1954; Crotalus adamanteus — Klauber, 1956

= Eastern diamondback rattlesnake =

Species of reptile endemic to the southeastern US

The eastern diamondback rattlesnake (Crotalus adamanteus) is a species of pit viper in the family Viperidae. The species is endemic to the Southeastern United States. It is the largest rattlesnake species and one of the heaviest venomous snakes in the Americas. No subspecies are recognized.

== Description ==
The eastern diamondback rattlesnake is the largest rattlesnake species and is one of the heaviest known species of venomous snake, with one specimen shot in 1946 measuring 2.4 m (7.8 ft) in length and weighing 15.4 kg (34 lb). However, other venomous snakes may rival this species in weight such as the much longer but more slender king cobra and the shorter but even bulkier Gaboon viper. Maximum reported lengths for the eastern diamondback rattlesnake are 2.4 m (8 ft) and 2.5 m (8.25 ft). However, the stated maximum sizes have been called into question due to a lack of voucher specimens. Demonstrating rare reverse sexual size dimorphism, males are typically larger than females.

Specimens over 2.1 m (7 ft) are rare, but well documented. Klauber (1998) included a letter he received from E. Ross Allen in 1953, in which Allen explains how for years he offered a reward of $100, and later $200, for an 2.4 m (8 ft) specimen, dead or alive. The reward was never claimed. He did receive a number of 2.1 m (7 ft) range specimens and some 2.4 m (8 ft) skins, but said such skins can be taken from specimens as short as 1.8 m (6 ft). A 2.2 m (7.3 ft) specimen was caught and killed outside a neighborhood in St. Augustine, Florida in September 2009.

The average size is much less. Specimens are rarely found over 6 feet in length. Lengths of 1.1 to 1.7 m (3.5 to 5.5 ft), and 0.8 to 1.8 m (2.75 to 6 ft) are given. One study found an average length of 1.7 m (5.6 ft) based on 31 males and 43 females. The average body mass is roughly 2.3 kg (5.1 lb). The average weight of 9 laboratory-kept specimens was 2.55 kg (5.6 lb), with a range of 0.8 to 4.9 kg (1.8 to 10.8 lb). Few specimens can exceed 5.12 kg (11.3 lb), although exceptional specimens can weigh 6.7 kg (15 lb) or more.

The scalation includes 25–31 (usually 29) rows of dorsal scales at midbody, 165–176/170–187 ventral scales in males/females and 27–33/20–26 subcaudal scales in males/females, respectively. On the head, the rostral scale is higher than it is wide and contacts two internasal scales. There are 10–21 scales in the internasal-prefrontal region and 5–11 (usually 7–8) intersupraocular scales. Usually, there are two loreal scales between preoculars and the postnasal. There are 12–17 (usually 14–15) supralabial scales, the first of which is in broad contact with the prenasal, and 15–21 (usually 17–18) sublabial scales.

The color pattern consists of a brownish, brownish-yellow, brownish-gray or olive ground color, overlaid with a series of 24–35 dark brown to black diamonds with slightly lighter centers. Each of these diamond-shaped blotches is outlined with a row of cream or yellowish scales. Posteriorly, the diamond shapes become more like crossbands and are followed by 5–10 bands around the tail. The belly is a yellowish or cream-colored, with diffused, dark mottling along the sides. The head has a dark postocular stripe that extends from behind the eye backward and downward to the lip; the back of the stripe touches the angle of the mouth. Anteriorly and posteriorly, the postocular stripe is bordered by distinct white or yellow stripes. The rattle at the end of their tail is made of hard, loosely attached, hollow segments which break off frequently and are completely replaced when the snake sheds.

== Common names ==
Other common names for this snake species include eastern diamond-backed rattlesnake, eastern diamondback, diamond rattlesnake, diamond-back rattlesnake, common rattlesnake, diamond-back, diamond(-patch) rattler, eastern diamond-back (rattlesnake), eastern diamond rattlesnake, Florida diamond-back (rattlesnake), Florida rattlesnake, lozenge-spotted rattlesnake, rattler, rattlesnake, southeastern diamond-backed rattlesnake, southeastern diamond-backed rattler, southern woodland rattler, timber rattler, water rattle, water rattlesnake, and diamondback rattlesnake.

== Geographic range ==
The eastern diamondback rattlesnake is found in the Southeastern United States from southeastern North Carolina, south along the coastal plain through peninsular Florida to the Florida Keys, and west along the Gulf Coast through southern Alabama and Mississippi to southeastern Louisiana. The original description for the species does not include a type locality, although Schmidt (1953) proposed it be restricted to "Charleston, South Carolina" (USA).

== Conservation status ==
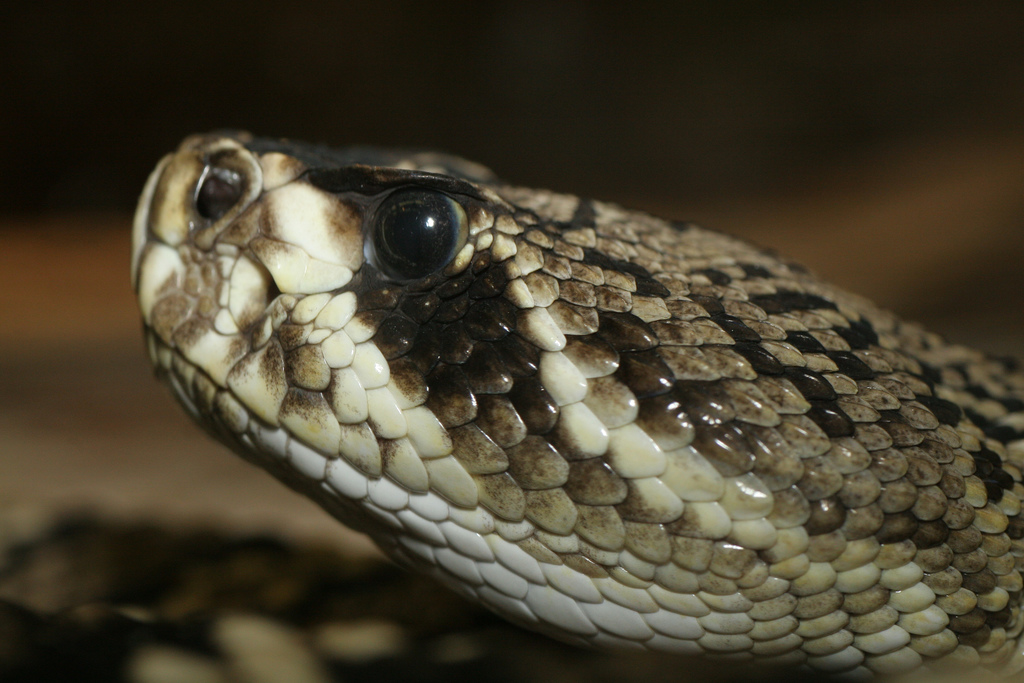
Eastern diamondback rattlesnake at the Saint Louis Zoo

This snake species is classified as Least Concern on the IUCN Red List (v3.1, 2001). Species are listed as such owing to their wide distribution or presumed large population, or because they are unlikely to be declining fast enough to qualify for listing in a more threatened category. The population trend was down when assessed in 2007.

In North Carolina, the eastern diamondback rattlesnake is protected by state law and considered endangered within the state. It is likely extirpated in Louisiana, having last been observed there in 1995. In fact some scientists and conservationists believe it may even be extirpated in North Carolina, having last been observed there in the early 1990s.

This species is currently under review for being added to the Endangered Species List by the United States Fish and Wildlife Service owing to its recent decline, and the current population represents only 3% of the historical population.

Eastern diamondback rattlesnakes (Crotalus adamanteus, EDB) have limited ability to adapt to habitat loss and fragmentation due to the species' slow life history, high habitat specificity, and minimal dispersal ability. Threats to eastern diamondback rattlesnake include habitat loss, killing by humans, and highway mortality. Rattlesnake roundups are another threat to this species, as they are removed from the wild and killed for exhibition and entertainment. One common method of capture at these events involves pouring gasoline down a rattlesnake's supposed burrow, a practice which is harmful to both the snake and its environment. A study was conducted in South Carolina that showed positive results in translocating species to save them due to their inability to adapt to habitat loss.

== Habitat ==
The eastern diamondback rattlesnake inhabits upland dry pine forest, pine and palmetto flatwoods, sandhills and coastal maritime hammocks, longleaf pine/turkey oak habitats, grass-sedge marshes and swamp forest, cypress swamps, mesic hammocks, sandy mixed woodlands, xeric hammocks, and salt marshes, as well as wet prairies during dry periods. In many areas, it seems to use burrows made by gophers and gopher tortoises during the summer and winter. Wiregrass ground layer is a very important habitat characteristic with wiregrass being present in areas that are burned frequently with open forest canopies

== Behavior ==
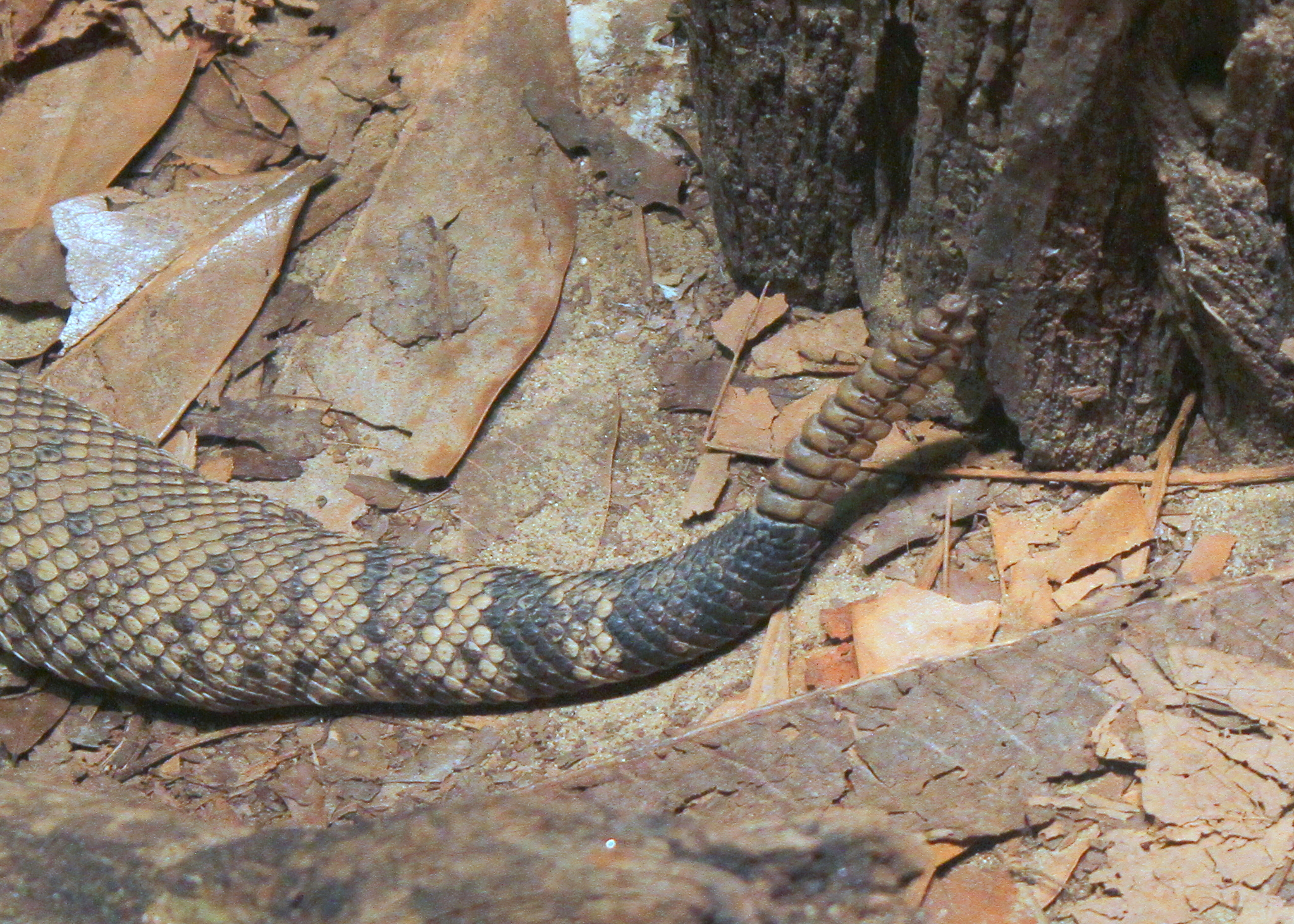
Detail of rattle

The eastern diamondback rattlesnake frequently shelters by tunneling in gopher and tortoise burrows, emerging in the early morning or afternoon to bask. Some research shows that these snakes spend less time underground during their active seasons.

Like most rattlesnakes, this species is terrestrial and not adept at climbing. However, it has on occasion been reported in bushes and trees, apparently in search of prey. Even large specimens have been spotted as high as 10 m (33 ft) above the ground.

It is also known to be an excellent swimmer. Specimens have often been spotted crossing stretches of water between barrier islands and the mainland off the Georgia coast, in the Gulf of Mexico and in the Florida Keys, sometimes miles from land.

Individual disposition varies, with some allowing close approach while remaining silent, and others starting to rattle at a distance of 6–9 m (20–30 ft). The rattle is well developed and can be heard from relatively far away. When threatened, it raises the anterior half of the body off the ground in an S-shaped coil, and can strike to a distance of at least a third of its body length. Rattlesnakes will strike their prey within a tenth of a second. Many will stand their ground and may strike repeatedly, but if given the opportunity, they will usually retreat while facing the intruder and moving backward toward shelter, after which they disappear.

One popular myth is that the eastern diamondback rattlesnake must rattle before striking. To the contrary, it is quite capable of striking while remaining completely silent.

== Feeding ==
The eastern diamondback rattlesnake forages actively or lies in ambush for small mammals, especially rabbits and rice rats (Oryzomys). The diet also includes birds. Eastern diamondback rattlesnakes may sit and wait in a coiled position for up to a week while waiting for prey. Prey is struck and released, after which the snake follows the scent trail left by the dying prey.

Because of their large size, adults have no problem eating prey as large as fully grown cottontail rabbits. As the juveniles are capable of swallowing adult mice, they do not often resort to eating slimmer prey, such as lizards. In fact, eastern cottontails and marsh rabbits (Sylvilagus) form the bulk of the diet in most parts of Florida. Squirrels, rats, and mice are also eaten, along with birds such as towhees and bobwhite quail. Other prey that have been reported include a king rail, a young wild turkey, and a mother woodpecker along with four of her eggs. It also eats large insects. In times of scarce prey, eastern diamondbacks have been known to eat carrion.

== Reproduction ==
Rattlesnakes, including the eastern diamondback, are ovoviviparous. Gestation lasts six or seven months and broods average about a dozen young. However, the young only stay with the mother 10–20 days before they set off on their own to hunt and find cover. Their life history is considered to be slow since they breed on intervals of 2–4 years.

Females give birth to between 4 and 28 young at a time, usually between July and early October. Neonates are 30–36 cm (12–14 in) in length and are similar in appearance to the adults, except for having only a small button instead of a rattle on the tip of their tails.

== Captivity ==
Adult wild-caught specimens are often difficult to maintain in captivity, but captive-born individuals do quite well and feed readily on killed laboratory rodents. The eastern diamondback requires a dry and well-ventilated cage with a hide-box, maintained at a temperature of 23–27 °C (73–80 °F) for normal activity.

== Venom ==
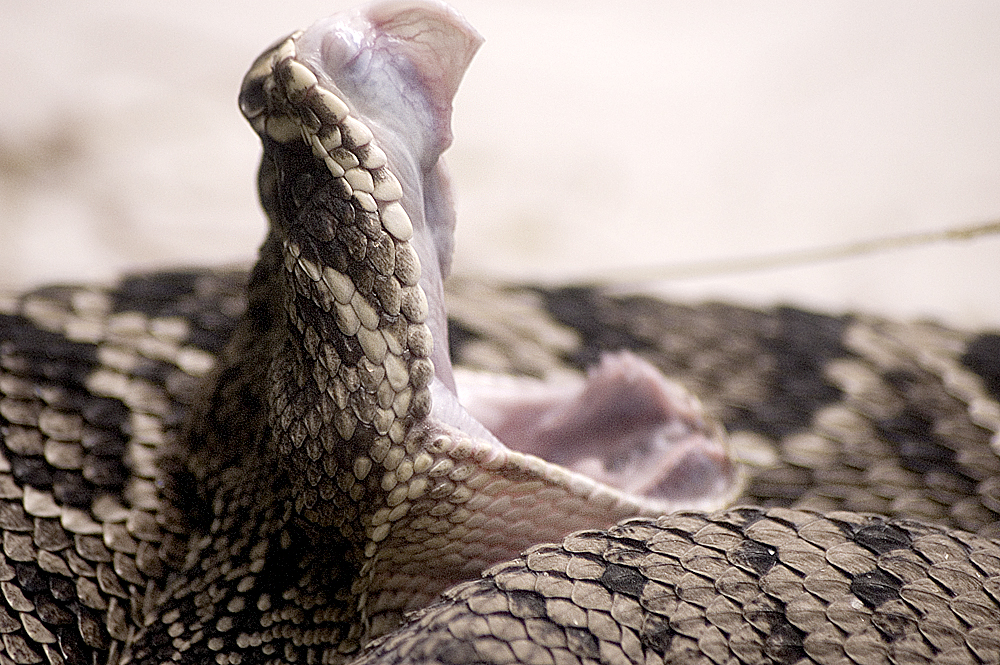
An eastern diamondback rattlesnake showing one of its venomous fangs, Louisville Zoo, Louisville, KY

The eastern diamondback rattlesnake has the reputation of being the most dangerous venomous snake in North America. While not usually aggressive, it is large and powerful. Wright and Wright mentioned a mortality rate of 30%, but other studies show a mortality rate of 10–20% (untreated). The eastern diamondback rattlesnake is a major leader of fatal snakebites within its geographical range.

In proportion to its length, it has the longest fangs of any rattlesnake species, with calculations leading one to expect an 2.4-meter (8 ft) specimen would have fangs with a total length of over 25 mm (1 in). For comparison, a 1.5-meter (5 ft) specimen had fangs measuring 17 mm (2/3 in) in length. It has a very high venom yield, an average of 400–450 mg, with a maximum of 858–1,000 mg. Brown gives an average venom yield of 410 mg (dried venom), along with LD_{50} values of 1.3–2.4 mg/kg IV, 1.7–3.0 mg/kg IP and 10-14.5 mg/kg SC for toxicity. The estimated human lethal dose is 100–150 mg.

Eastern diamondback rattlesnake venom is estimated to contain over 100 different toxins. This venom is one of the most studied snake venoms with around 40 toxins characterized. The venom contains a thrombin-like enzyme, "crotalase", capable of clotting fibrinogen, leading to the secondary activation of plasminogen from endothelial cells. Although the venom does not activate platelets, the production of fibrin strands can result in a reduced platelet count, as well as the hemolysis of red blood cells (see article on MAHA). Even with this defibrination, however, clinically significant bleeding is uncommon. Nevertheless, the venom does exhibit high hemorrhagic activity. It also contains a low-molecular-weight basic peptide that impedes neuromuscular transmission and can in theory lead to cardiac failure. This peptide is similar to crotamine from C. durrisus terrificus, and makes up 2–8% of the protein found in the venom. In general, the venom can be described as highly necrotizing, mildly proteolytic and containing a large phosphodiesterase fraction. It stimulates the release of bradykinin that can result in severe pain, as well as profound, transient hypotension.

Klauber described one case in which the symptoms included instant pain "like two hot hypodermic needles", spontaneous bleeding from the bite site, intense internal pain, bleeding from the mouth, hypotension, a weak pulse, swelling and discoloration of the affected limb, and associated severe pain. The symptoms were further described as strongly hemolytic and hemorrhagic.

CroFab, Anavip, and Wyeth's ACP are effective antivenins (antivenoms) against bites from this species, although massive doses may be needed to manage severe cases of envenomation. Generally, ACP is very effective at countering the defibrination syndrome that is often seen, but may do little for low platelet counts. Wyeth's ACP is no longer being manufactured.
